= COVID-19 vaccination in Bulgaria =

Plan to immunize against COVID-19

COVID-19 vaccination campaign in Bulgaria
- Native name: Национален план за ваксиниране срещу COVID-19 в Република България
- Date: 27 December 2020 – present
- Location: nationwide
- Cause: COVID-19 pandemic
- Organised by: Bulgarian Ministry of Health, National Vaccination Operational Headquarters
- Participants: 4,726,578 doses administered in total (12 June 2024); (Note: These official figures are not equivalent to the number of unique individuals who have received at least one injection, as the doses administered include those who have had their second shots.) (Note: The percentages of vaccinated shown below cover all age groups and assume a total population of Bulgaria of 6,916,548, in accordance with figures provided by the National Statistical Institute for 31 December 2020.) Specific breakdown: 2,000,000+ have received one vaccine dose 28.9% 2,078,006 have been fully immunized 30.0% 1,008,184 have received a booster dose 14.6% 135,614 have received an Omicron-adapted booster dose 2.0%

The COVID-19 vaccination in Bulgaria is an immunization campaign currently taking place against SARS-CoV-2, the virus that is the cause of the COVID-19 disease. It began on 27 December 2020, in line with most other countries in the EU, and is in response to the ongoing pandemic in Bulgaria. The vaccination drive was affected by organizational and supply-related issues during the initial months while since the spring of 2021 vaccine hesitancy has contributed significantly to the country having the lowest rate of inoculations in the EU, with 35% of Bulgaria's adult citizens, and 30% of its eligible population, fully vaccinated by May 2022.

== Background ==
After being one of the first countries in Europe to enter a lockdown, which came into effect on 13 March 2020, five days after the first case was confirmed and when there were 23 people with positive tests, Bulgaria had mostly cluster-based transmission and a relatively low rate of infection compared to many other sovereign states on the continent up until mid June 2020 (when the vast majority of restrictions were lifted), managing to a large extent to be spared from a first wave, with the timely lockdown saving 15,000 to 19,000 lives according to one assessment. However, it was heavily affected during the autumn months, over the course of which the health system came under severe strain, reaching a state of near collapse, resulting in a very high death toll per capita, especially for the month of November and early December 2020.

The authorities' handling of the pandemic has been criticized for insufficient levels of testing for the virus, the nature of the policies in relation to the quarantining of foreign arrivals and the lax enforcement, especially outside the capital city, an absence of an adequate exit strategy after the first lockdown, contributing to rather loose general measures against the spread of the virus during the summer of 2020, poor preparedness of the country's health system for the second wave of the pandemic, contradictory and inconsistent messaging, downplaying the gravity of the epidemiological situation as well as not following some of the recommendations of health experts due to concerns that the imposition of tight measures, purportedly not resonating with the wishes of most of the population, could pile on public pressure on the government, which faced political protests from July 2020 to April 2021. Medical professionals and politicians have expressed the view that the second partial lockdown that entered into force just before midnight of 28 November 2020 should have come earlier, at least three to four weeks before it was imposed and with stricter restrictions. Infection rates soared during March 2021, approaching the autumn levels and causing an even sharper rise in hospitalizations than in the preceding months, which prompted the government to impose a third lockdown from 22 to 31 March, though this once again garnered criticism for being a reactive measure that was long overdue and followed the almost complete reopening of the economy in the previous weeks, with medical professionals expressing concerns that its length was insufficient. Prime Minister Boyko Borisov has been accused of populism, with some analysts drawing comparisons with Donald Trump's approach to the pandemic, by prioritizing the interests of lobbies in the entertainment business and hospitality industries over those of health care establishments as well as allowing political considerations relating to the spring elections to influence the nature of the policy decisions. Some of the lockdown-related measures implemented during the spring of 2020, such as the closures of public parks, have been subject to criticism due to being regarded as overly harsh in terms of the fines levied and not being justifiable on epidemiological grounds, as well as reflective of what some sources have denounced as a panic-inducing general approach of the authorities in the early stages of the pandemic.

The caretaker government's policies in relation to the pandemic have invited disapproval due to being plagued by many of the same shortcomings as the ones implemented by Borisov's administration with some analysts characterizing its performance as worse than that of its predecessor government, in part for not implementing sufficiently strict measures and not attaching enough priority to the prioritization and popularization of the vaccination campaign, which has been a major contributing factor to the very serious fourth pandemic wave experienced in the autumn of 2021 that saw health systems struggling to deal with the patient flow as early as October 2021, Bulgaria activating the EU civil protection mechanism, requesting medical supplies and equipment, and the country being included by the European Centre for Disease Control among the 10 EU states facing a COVID-19 situation of "very high concern".

The Petkov government has also attracted multiple criticisms, especially due to what has been regarded as a failure to boost support for the vaccination campaign.

Molecular biologist Georgi Marinov from Stanford University, a proponent of the COVID-Zero strategy who has characterized "living with COVID" as having blurred the distinction between developed and developing countries, with the former's tolerant attitude to the virus causing them to descend into Third World status from an epidemiological standpoint, and is supportive of the Chinese approach (in place until December 2022) of tight border controls, strict lockdowns and contact tracing, has expressed a belief that since May 2020 the governing bodies in Bulgaria have essentially abdicated from controlling the pandemic, also cautioning that while vaccination is quite important, it should not be an excuse for the premature abolishment of non-pharmaceutical interventions, as such a course of action would be morally impermissible due to inevitably leading to preventable deaths, including among the fully vaccinated. In a December 2021 interview, former COVID-19 taskforce head Ventsislav Mutafchiyski confirmed that Bulgaria had subscribed to a COVID-Zero philosophy until 13 May 2020 when the state of national emergency was lifted. From 1 April 2022, based on a prior decision of the Council of Ministers of Bulgaria, almost all non-pharmaceutical interventions such as capacity limits and mask mandates were abolished. From 17 November 2022, all compulsory public health measures related to COVID-19 were removed.

Mathematician Lachezar Tomov has pointed out that the outcome in Bulgaria may have been worse if the levels of travel within the country and the inter-connectedness of its regions were comparable to those of Western European countries such as the United Kingdom.

In November 2021, cardiologist Ivo Petrov characterized Bulgaria as an extremely negative example in the handling of the COVID-19 crisis and as being part of an experiment, in which it is the control group representing the unvaccinated in comparison to the developed countries, pleading with the people to get themselves vaccinated in order to turn the tide in the demographic catastrophe. The mortality rate from COVID-19 in the country has been significantly above the EU average and among the highest in the world, with substantial excess deaths for the years 2020 and 2021.

According to the COVID-19 Stringency Index, the country reached a peak of 73.15 (out of 100) during the first lockdown, with the second one being the least strict (having an apogee of 57.41) while the third one saw 61.11 as the highest value.

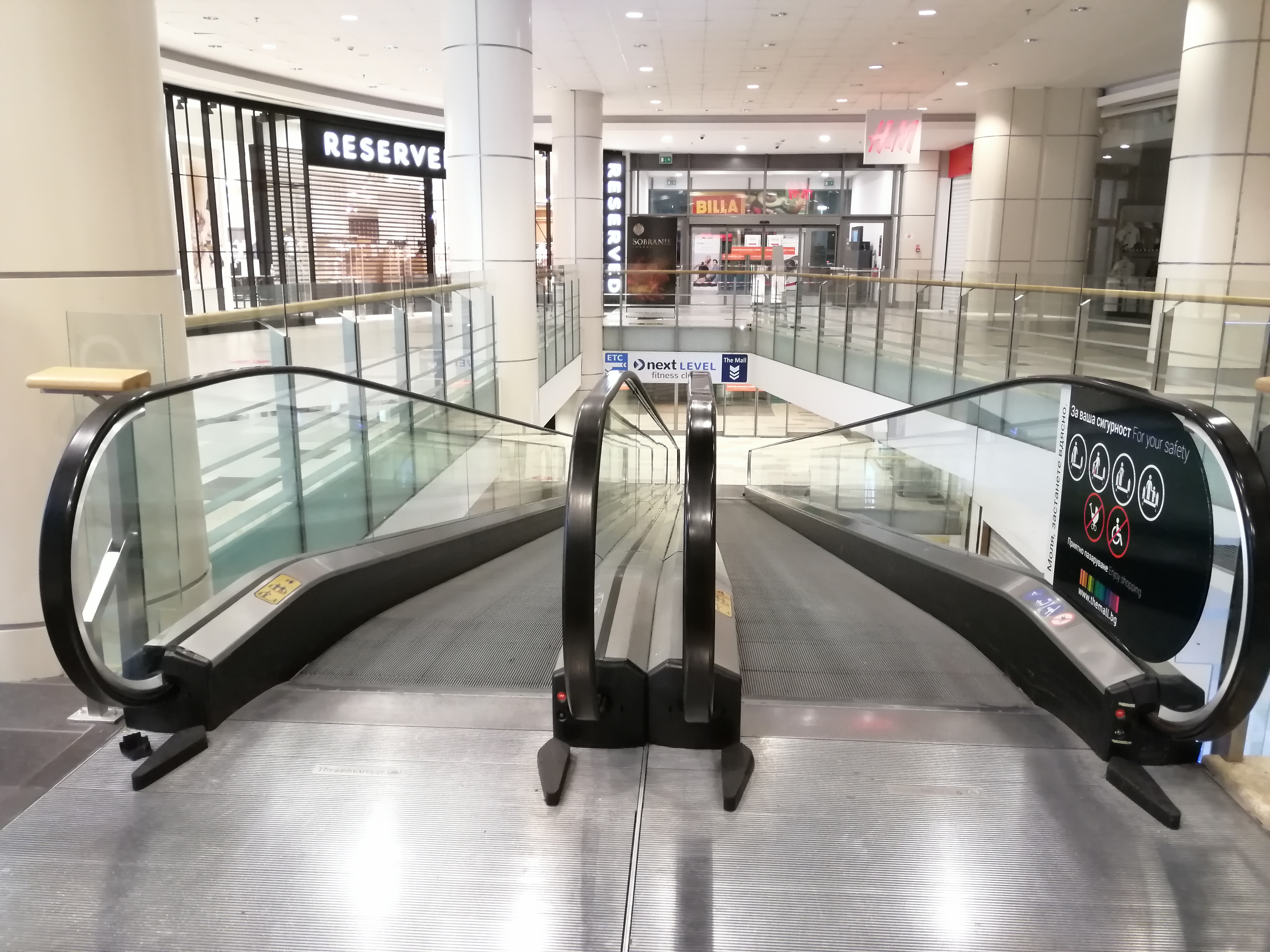
The Mall in January 2021, during the second partial lockdown in Bulgaria.

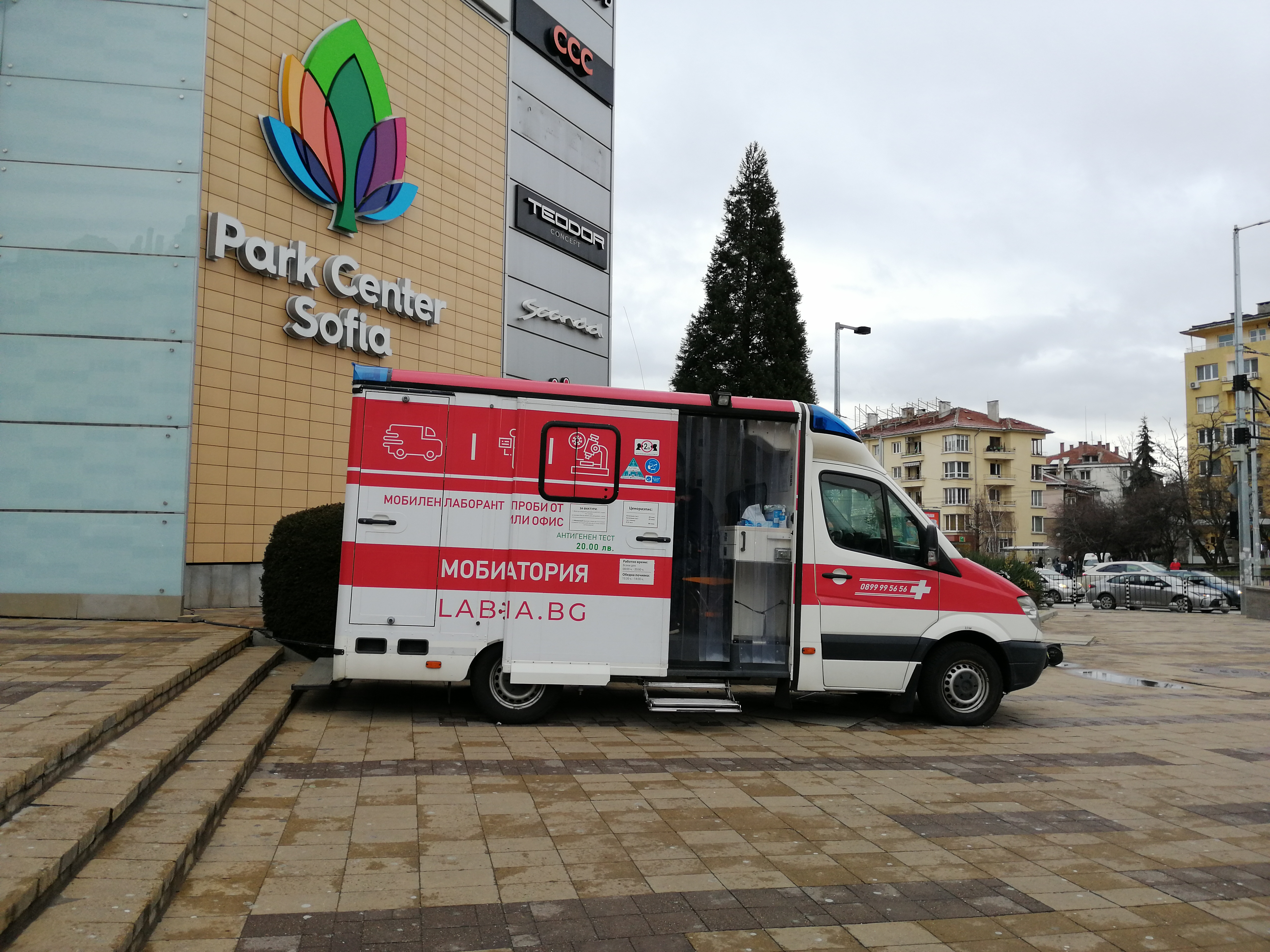
A January 2022 photo of a mobile laboratory located at the entrance to Park Center Sofia that offers tests for COVID-19.

The Lowy Institute ranked Bulgaria 67th out of 98 countries in terms of its performance in tackling COVID-19, awarding it a score of 37.4 (the maximum being 100) on 9 January 2021. On 13 March 2021, in a second Lowy Institute assessment, Bulgaria had retained the 67th spot (this time out of 102 countries), accumulating 38.2 points.

In the early months of the pandemic, there was speculation that the BCG vaccine, of which the country is a major producer and which has been part of the mandatory vaccination package for newborns in Bulgaria since 1951, offers some degree of protection against COVID-19, with studies in the Netherlands suggesting that it serves as a powerful immune stimulator. However, this has not been corroborated by most scientific sources and the WHO maintains that there is so far a lack of evidence that the vaccine demonstrates effectiveness against COVID-19.

Even though two thirds of Bulgarian citizens reported being in good health in the years prior to the pandemic, which was only slightly below the EU average, the overall health status of the population has been characterized as being of high concern due to factors connected to lifestyle choices and a tendency for many people to neglect their annual medical check-ups.

Bulgaria had been one of the countries in Europe the most strongly affected by the 1918 influenza pandemic, losing approximately 2% of its then population to the virus.

In January 2006, a National Pandemic Preparedness Plan was approved, which had a particular focus on a future outbreak of a flu pandemic. In December 2020, Kostadin Angelov, the then Health Minister, stated that the document in question had been updated to reflect the new realities. However, some figures from the medical community claim that the plan was virtually forgotten and never consulted by the authorities when deciding on their response to COVID-19.

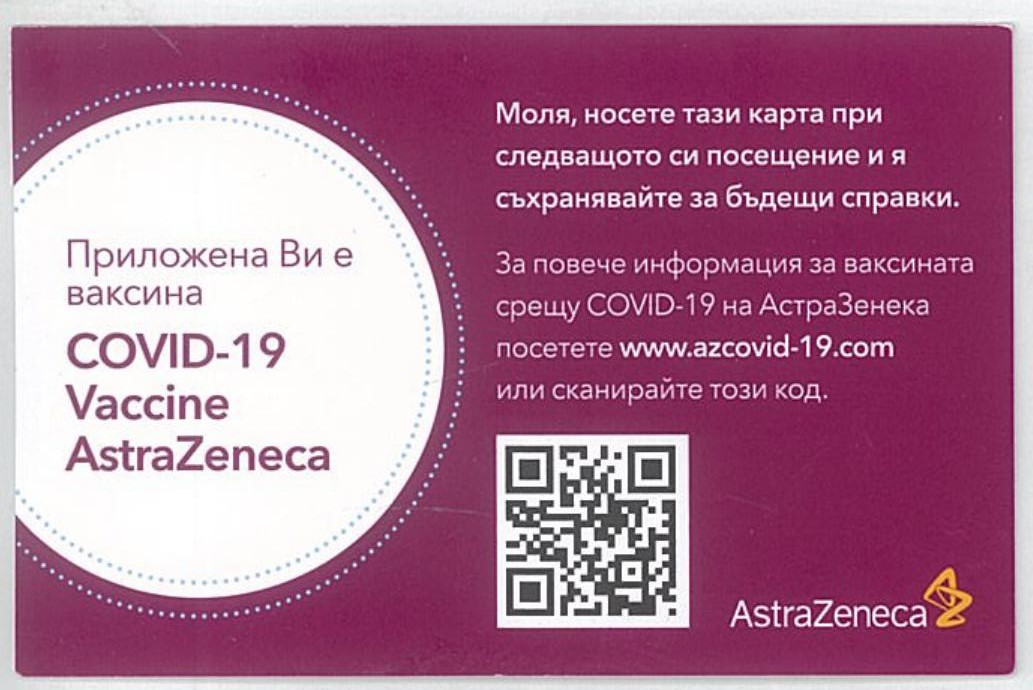
A Bulgarian official printout given to a person who has received an Oxford–AstraZeneca vaccine.

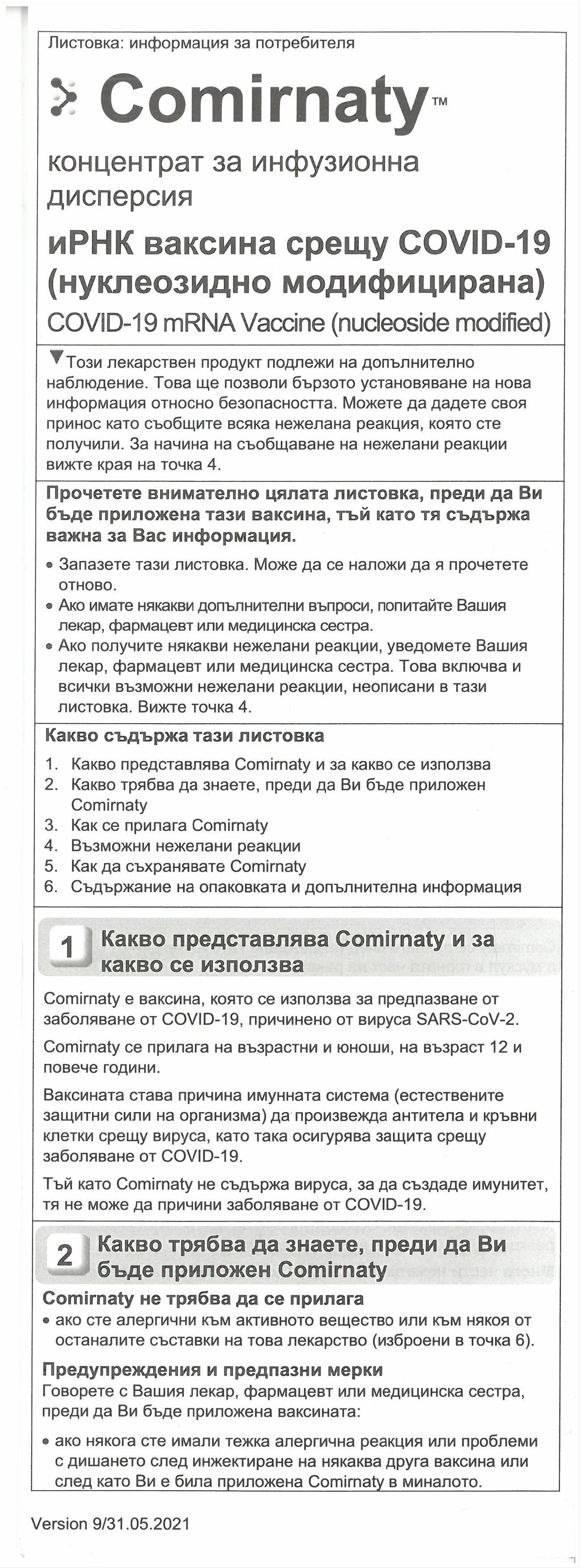
The first page of a Pfizer–BioNTech vaccine information leaflet in Bulgarian.

== Vaccines ==
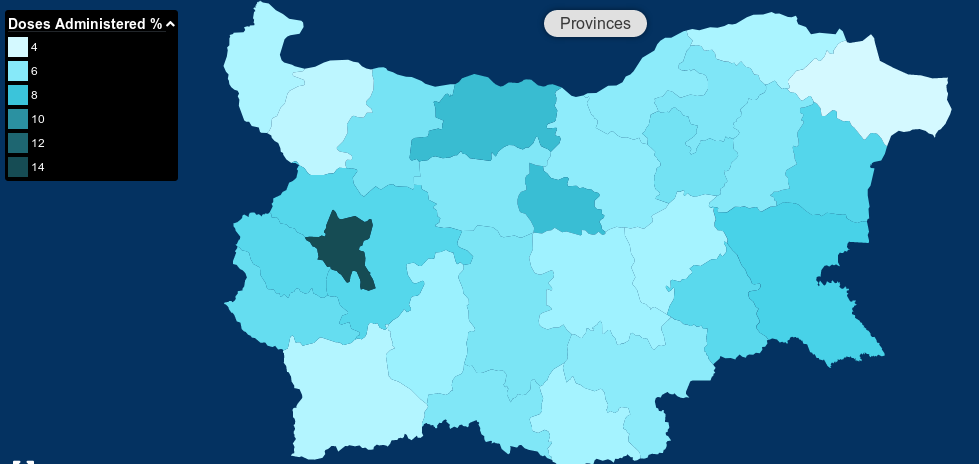
Map of Bulgaria showing the vaccination rate as a percentage of each province's population as of 9 April 2021.

=== Pre-orders of vaccines and procedural matters ===
==== European Union vaccine negotiations ====
Bulgaria eventually agreed to purchase all seven vaccines included in the European portfolio - Moderna, Pfizer-BioNTech, Oxford–AstraZeneca, Sanofi, CureVac, Novavax, and Janssen, even though it had some reservations regarding its participation in the contract with Janssen Pharmaceutica. On 14 October 2020 Bulgaria explicitly refused to pre-order the latter's vaccine candidate as part of the EU-wide deal, but reversed course in November and ratified a separate agreement for 2 million doses in December, aided by Sweden's cooperation, with the change of heart partly attributed to concerns pertaining to the progress made by Oxford-AstraZeneca at the time. Some Bulgarian experts reportedly considered the European vaccine portfolio to be overly diverse. After major delays due to trial issues of Sanofi and GlaxoSmithKline's vaccine candidate, for 2021 the country was in the initial months mostly reliant on the Oxford–AstraZeneca COVID-19 vaccine, expecting to receive enough doses for vaccinating 2.5 million citizens. After at first ordering 1 million doses from Pfizer-BioNTech, on 13 January 2021 when the European Commission announced that it had concluded an agreement for extra 300 million doses with this vaccine producer, Bulgaria requested additional 2.9 million Pfizer-BioNTech vaccines, with a later agreement resulting in the quantity of pre-ordered doses of this vaccine for 2021 rising to 5.4 million.

In total, the amount of vaccine pre-ordered or set to be ordered by the country is expected to be equivalent to 18 million doses, able to cover 9 million citizens.

In May 2021, Bulgaria made a pre-order for 14 million Pfizer vaccine doses for 2022 and 2023, with 8,354,768 expected for the latter year.

In August 2021, it was revealed that Bulgaria had pre-ordered a new type of attenuated vaccine, developed by Valneva Austria. In September 2021, it was confirmed that Bulgaria will buy only 10,000 out of the pre-arranged doses from the one-shot Sanofi Pasteur SA/Glaxosmithkline Biologicals SA vaccine, which are to be delivered in 2022.

In August 2023, it was confirmed that Bulgaria will receive 1,3 million doses from the adapted Pfizer-BioNTech vaccine, which targets the XBB.1.5 Omicron variant.

==== Vaccine availability issues, further deals and new approach to the ordering of vaccines ====
On 25 February 2021, then Health Minister Kostadin Angelov publicly reproached AstraZeneca after it became clear that the pharmaceutical company will be able to provide 40% of the promised vaccines by August. Bulgaria had also offered to assist with the delivery of the next batch of vaccines by sending its own airplane, but this suggestion had not been accepted. On the next day it was revealed that there is an alternative plan, which will entail receiving an extra 1 million Pfizer-BioNtech and 480 000 Moderna doses between March and June.

On 28 February 2021, Boyko Borisov confirmed that Bulgaria had entered talks to borrow vaccines from EU countries where there is no queuing for them, so that Bulgaria does not have to halt its vaccination process. On 1 March 2021, it was disclosed that Bulgaria had arranged for over 450 000 additional doses of the Moderna vaccine, as a result of a direct agreement with Sweden.

In early March 2021, Bulgaria and five other EU countries (Slovenia, Croatia, Austria, Czech Republic, and Latvia) insisted that a new debate is initiated regarding the allocation of the vaccines within the EU bloc, with Boyko Borisov echoing Austrian Chancellor Sebastian Kurz's sentiment that some EU states had received more vaccines than warranted by their population numbers. On 13 March 2021, the European Commission sent out statement clarifying that some member states, with Bulgaria being implied to be among them, had on their own accord deviated from the principle of pro rata allocation during the initial placing of orders for vaccines, freeing up additional doses for other countries. Bulgaria is believed to have refrained from exercising its option of ordering 30 million doses in total. On 26 March 2021, Croatian Prime Minister Andrej Plenković stated that Bulgaria should receive the most relative to the other countries out of the 10 million doses of Pfizer-BioNTech vaccines that will arrive in the second quarter of the year, earlier than scheduled, as a compensation for the production issues faced by AstraZeneca. Even though Austria (that led the redistribution campaign), Slovenia and the Czech Republic rejected the eventual proposal that was arrived at, in early April 2021, it was confirmed that Bulgaria (alongside Croatia, Slovakia, Latvia, and Estonia) will in addition to getting its pro rata allocation, also benefit from the sharing of 2.85 million "solidarity vaccines" (out of the 10 million doses) among these five countries.

In May 2022, the Ministry of Health sent out a letter to the European Commission, emphasizing that while it remains committed to securing a wide range of vaccines for Bulgarian citizens, it believes that there should be a high degree of flexibility regarding the amount of vaccines bought, in accordance with the needs of the population in order not to have another scenario with an excess of vaccines.

In early 2023, the health authorities confirmed that Bulgaria is in favor of cancelling the European Commission's contract with Pfizer/BioNTech or would support an approach to the ordering of vaccines where the deliveries reflect the specific requests of each country. Bulgaria's position regarding the potential issues surrounding an excess of vaccines has been seen as being in alignment with that of Poland as well as six other EU member states. After a new agreement was eventually reached between the European Commission and Pfizer-BioNTech in May 2023, it was revealed that Bulgaria would only receive the already paid for and postponed (in terms of delivery) quantities of vaccines for the year 2022, with no new vaccines to be delivered to the country until 2026 when the contract with the pharmaceutical company comes to an end, unless explicitly requested by Bulgarian authorities, in accordance with the Bulgarian citizens' needs. Bulgaria will still have guaranteed priority access to newly adapted Pfizer-BioNTech vaccines offering protection against novel COVID-19 strains over the course of the next three years. The country paid a tax equivalent to 134,2 million leva in order to turn down the deliveries of vaccines, but also saved 188 million leva due to the deliveries not taking place.

=== Other vaccines ===
According to Todor Kantardzhiev, one of the members of the National Operational Headquarters for the fight against the coronavirus, in 2021 Bulgaria did not rule out the purchase of vaccines from companies with which the European Commission had not negotiated contracts, such as Sputnik and the Sinopharm BIBP vaccine, as long as EU regulations were observed and especially if there was a delay regarding the delivery of the other vaccines.

On 26 February 2021, the opposition BSP party demanded that the government begin separate talks with Russia for the importation of the Sputnik vaccine. The Health Commission of the National Parliament initially rejected the proposal, but on 28 April 2021 accepted BSP's demands. However, even though ITN, Stand Up! Mafia, Get Out! and one deputy from Democratic Bulgaria joined forces with BSP during the vote on 7 May 2021, the proposal still did not pass the required threshold in the National Parliament, which would have empowered the Council of Ministers to take all necessary measures to secure access to Sputnik. Ethnic Bulgarians have been administered the Sputnik vaccine in Russia.

Microbiologist Andrey Chorbanov has pointed out that the country already imports medications that are not regulated by the EU, so the thinking should not be different when it comes to the Russian vaccine. The importing of vaccines from third countries was also supported by the RzB party, even if the EU is bypassed and only the Bulgarian Drug Agency approved them. Some journalists noted that Bulgaria recognized the vaccinations of foreign citizens with Sputnik as well as with the Sinopharm BIBP vaccine and CoronaVac as one of the conditions for entry into the country.

A COVID-19 vaccine based on nanoparticles is presently under development by the BAS, with completed preclinical research, but despite receiving financial support from the Pasteur Institute, issues related to funding are expected to significantly slow down the progress when it comes to the vaccine trials. It was unveiled to the wider public at the 15th World Congress of Vaccines held online in October 2021.

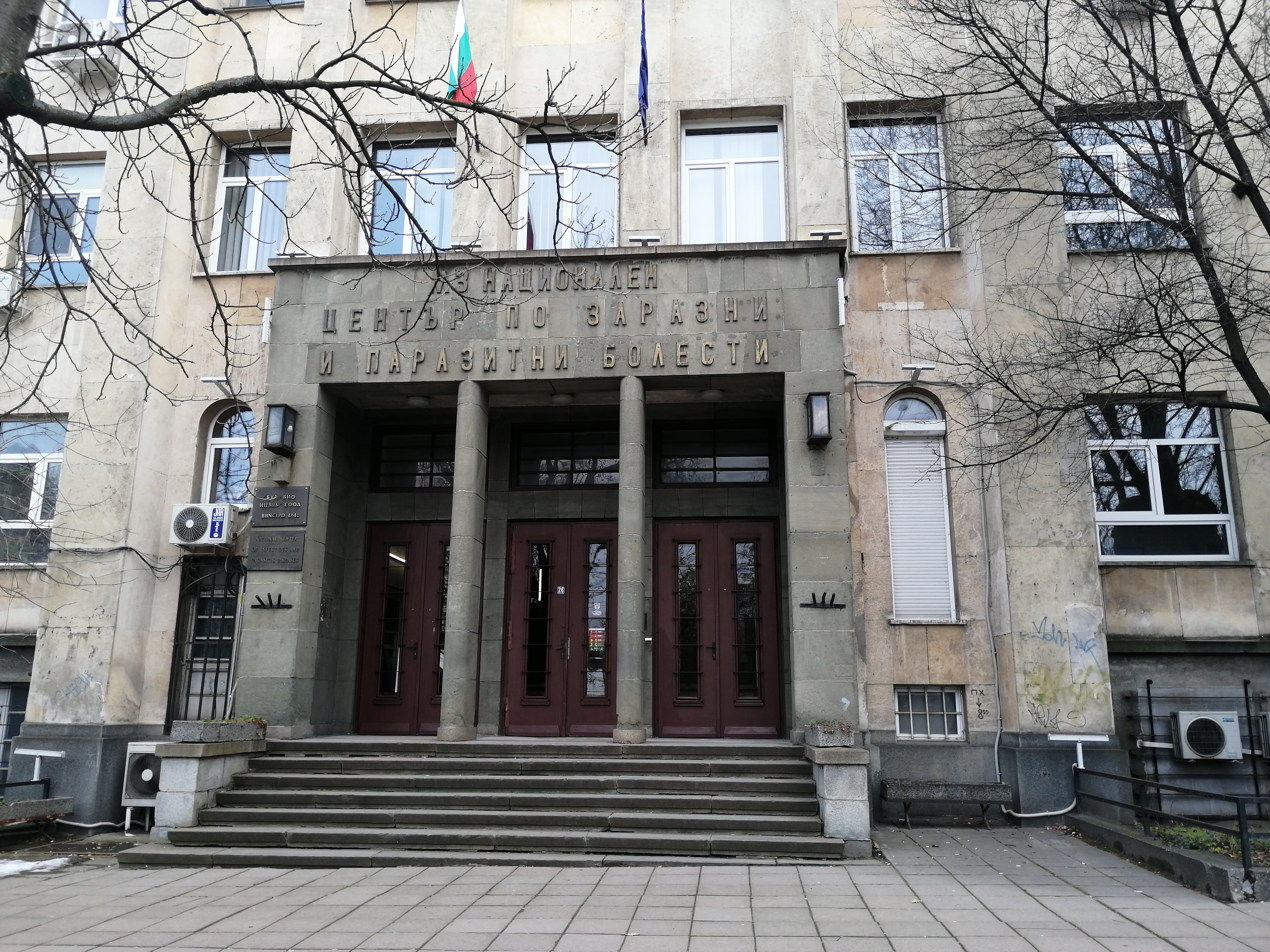
The National Center of Infectious and Parasitic Diseases in Sofia where some of the COVID-19 vaccines have been stored prior to their distribution.

=== Approved vaccines ===
Kostadin Angelov, the former Minister of Health, has on a number of occasions reiterated that Bulgarians should be able to have a choice regarding the type of vaccine they are to receive.

Five vaccines are currently available for use in Bulgaria.

The first to be administered in the country was Pfizer–BioNTech, which was approved by the European Commission on 21 December 2020, on the same day after receiving recommendation for granting conditional marketing authorization by the Committee for Medicinal Products for Human Use (CHMP) of the European Medicines Agency (EMA), with the initial doses delivered to Bulgaria 26 December, arriving from Belgium.

On 6 January 2021, following the same regulatory procedure, the Moderna vaccine was also given the green light by the European Commission, arriving in Bulgaria a week later.

On 29 January 2021, Oxford–AstraZeneca vaccine received conditional authorization by the European Commission, paving the way for its use in EU countries. On the same date, Kostadin Angelov stated in an interview with Boyko Vasilev during the TV show Panorama that Bulgaria will wait for the results of further studies regarding its effectiveness when it comes to people over the age of 65 before administering it to members of this age group. On 4 February 2021, Angelov clarified that there is no medical prohibition to give the vaccine to elderly people and that an additional statement will be made before Oxford-AstraZeneca begins to be administered. The government eventually concluded that the vaccine is useful for elderly citizens as well and did not exclude them from receiving it. The first batch of this vaccine reached Bulgaria on 6 February 2021.

On 11 March 2021, the one-shot Janssen vaccine (Johnson & Johnson) became the fourth vaccine to be conditionally approved on the EU level, arriving in Bulgaria slightly over a month later.

On 28 May 2021, EMA approved the administering of the Pfizer–BioNTech vaccine to children in the age range from 12 to 15.

On 23 July 2021, the same agency gave the green light for the use of the Moderna vaccine in children aged from 12 to 17.

On 4 October 2021, EMA recommended an extra dose, using either Pfizer–BioNTech or Moderna, for people aged 12 or above whose immune system is severely weakened, to be administered at least 28 days after the second injection. It also stated that such a booster dose may be considered, with Pfizer–BioNTech, for all other people aged 18 or over at least six months after the second shot. On 25 October 2021, the same agency also approved the administering of a booster dose with Moderna for all adults.

In November 2021, the Ministry of Health revealed that no deliveries of AstraZeneca had been made to Bulgaria since August 2021. Only 491 doses of this vaccine had been administered in September 2021 compared to over 60 000 in June 2021. However, in January 2022, 4800 new doses of AstraZeneca arrived in Bulgaria in response to specific demand for this vaccine.

On 25 November 2021, the Pfizer–BioNTech became the first COVID-19 vaccine in the EU to be approved for children below the age of 12, with the first pediatric doses arriving in Bulgaria on 20 December 2021.

On 15 December 2021, EMA approved the use of the Janssen vaccine as a booster. On 10 January 2022, Bulgaria followed suit in giving the nod to such an application of this vaccine. It can be administered two months after full vaccination (one dose) with the same vaccine and three months after a two-dose vaccination regimen with Pfizer–BioNTech or Moderna.

On 20 December 2021, Novavax joined the list of vaccines that can be used in the EU after receiving approval from EMA. Bulgarian health authorities confirmed that the country is yet to order doses from Novavax due to the country having an excess of vaccines. In January 2022, Health Minister Assena Serbezova stated that Bulgaria is looking at the option of obtaining Novavax vaccine doses from Sweden.

On 24 February 2022, Moderna was endorsed by EMA regarding its use in children aged from 6 to 11 years old and on 2 March 2022 the European Commission followed suit in approving the vaccine for children in this age cohort. Bulgarian health authorities gave it the green light for use in children in this age group from 11 March 2022.

On 23 June 2022, the Valneva vaccine was authorized by EMA (as well as by the European Commission on the next day), to be used as a primary vaccination for people from 18 to 50 years old, arriving in Bulgaria in late October 2022.

On 10 November 2022, VidPrevtyn Beta received EMA's and the European Commission's authorization, with the caveat that it is to be used as a booster following a primary vaccination course with a mRNA or adenoviral vaccine, becoming available in Bulgaria in January 2023.

On 30 August 2023, EMA approved the Pfizer–BioNTech Omicron XBB.1.5 vaccine.

On 14 September 2023, the regulatory agency also provided an authorization to the Moderna vaccine, which targets the XBB.1.5 Omicron variant. 80 640 doses of this vaccine arrived in Bulgaria a week later, with the starting date for them being administered envisioned to be 27 September 2023.

Vaccine	Doses ordered (Note: Until the end of 2021, option for additional 1.55 million doses from Novavax.) (Note: 13 909 963 doses in total for 2021.)	Approval	Deployment
Pfizer–BioNTech	5.4 million	21 December 2020	27 December 2020 (Note: This vaccine began to be administered to children aged 12 and over in June 2021, after being approved for everyone 16 and above in December 2020.) (Note: This vaccine began to be administered to children between the ages of 5 and 11 on 21 December 2021 after being cleared for use in November 2021.) (Note: This vaccine became available for children aged between 6 months and 4 years in January 2023 after being approved on the EU level in November 2022.)
Moderna	960 000	6 January 2021	14 January 2021 (Note: Cleared for use in children aged 12 and over in July 2021.) (Note: Approved for use in children from 6 to 11 years old in March 2022.) (Note: New Omicron-adapted version available in Bulgaria since 27 September 2023.)
Oxford-AstraZeneca	4.5 million	29 January 2021	7 February 2021 (Note: Almost phased out of the vaccination program since the summer of 2021.)
Janssen	2 million	11 March 2021	28 April 2021 (Note: A few doses of this vaccine were administered to specific target groups, such as the members of a refugee center in Harmanli, in the days prior to that date, thus before its official deployment for all Bulgarian citizens.)
Valneva	10 200	23 June 2022	November 2022
Sanofi	4.65 million	10 November 2022	January 2023 (Note: Only as a booster following a primary vaccination course.)
Novavax (Note: Pre-order agreement for Novavax cancelled by the caretaker Yanev Government in 2021.)	1.55 million	20 December 2021	Pending
CureVac	1 million	Pending	Pending

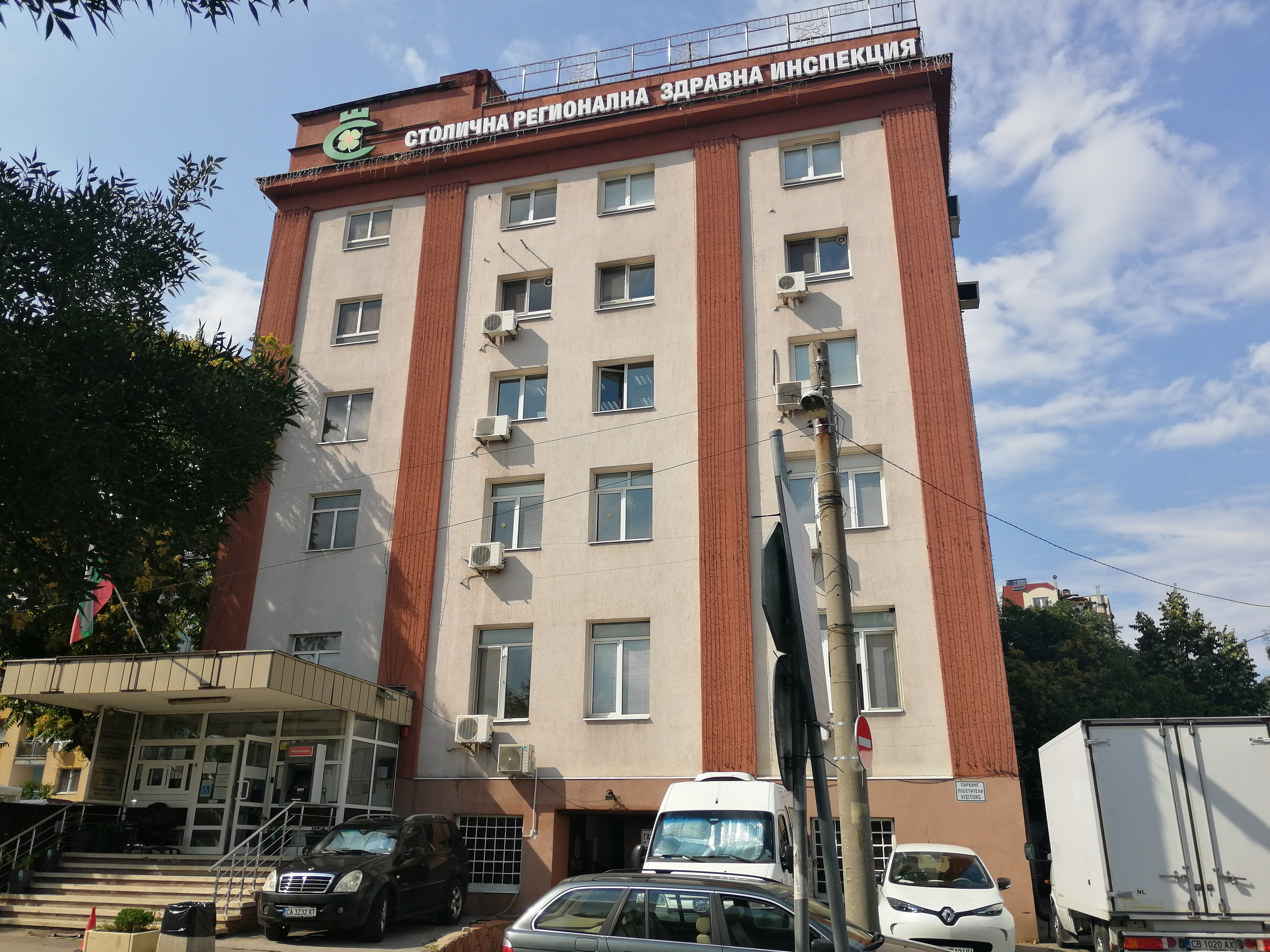
The Sofia Regional Health Inspectorate, which has held a coordinating role regarding the vaccination campaign.

=== Donated, sold and discarded vaccines ===
Towards the end of May 2021, Bulgaria confirmed that 50,000 AstraZeneca Oxford-AstraZeneca doses will be given to North Macedonia. With the supply of vaccines outstripping demand during the summer months, in July 2021 Bulgaria donated 172,500 doses of its AstraZeneca vaccines that were close to their expiration date to Bhutan. In August 2021, 50,000 doses of the same vaccine were given to Bosnia and Herzegovina as a donation while an agreement was reached with North Macedonia for the provision of 51,480 doses of the Pfizer–BioNTech vaccines as well as with Bhutan for another 172,500 AstraZeneca shots. During the same month, approximately 100,000 Moderna doses were resold to Norway and the country was also in the process of reselling 546,000 Pfizer-BioNTech vaccines to Portugal. In September 2021, it was also confirmed that Bangladesh will be the recipient of around 270,000 AstraZeneca doses. The country subsequently donated 258,570 Pfizer-BioNTech doses to Bosnia and Herzegovina as well as 2,830,400 AstraZeneca vaccines to Iran. In January 2023, it was revealed that Bulgaria had also been in touch with Poland, Sri Lanka and Maldives regarding the possibility of vaccine donations, but had only received an affirmative response from the Maldivian side.

As of October 2021, 184,089 AstraZeneca, 12,955 Moderna, 4500 Pfizer and 199 Janssen vaccine doses had been discarded due to reaching their expiration dates and no option for using them. The country has also been experiencing issues due to the limited amount of incinerators for disposing of unusable doses. As of August 2022, due to the low vaccine uptake, over 1,3 million vaccine doses had been declared unusable, with 1,6 million expected to have the same fate by the end of the year. By December 2022, the number of discarded or expected to be discarded vaccines exceeded 2 million. For 2023, 2,8 million doses remained superfluous and subject to discardment.

Vaccines donated or sold to other countries, as of 1 December 2022
Vaccine	Doses	Recipient country	Type of agreement
Oxford–AstraZeneca	270 000	Bangladesh	Donation
Oxford–AstraZeneca	172 500	Bhutan	Donation
Oxford–AstraZeneca	50 000	Bosnia and Herzegovina	Donation
Pfizer–BioNTech	258 570	Bosnia and Herzegovina	Donation
Oxford–AstraZeneca	2 830 400	Iran	Donation
Pfizer–BioNTech	51 480	North Macedonia	Donation
Moderna	100 000	Norway	Reselling

== Rollout schedule and vaccine priority groups ==
The national vaccination plan was unveiled in early December 2020 and includes five phases. For the purpose of the vaccination campaign, the country was subdivided into six regions (Vratsa, Veliko Tarnovo, Varna, Bourgas, Plovdiv, and Sofia). Kostadin Angelov, the then Health Minister, characterized it as a "dynamic plan" that could render itself to change in accordance with the situation and stated that Bulgaria drew on WHO guidance as well as the vaccination plans of Germany, France, Italy, Britain, and a number of US states, while also taking into account the specific conditions pertaining to Bulgarian health care, territory and infrastructure. A National Vaccination Operational Headquarters, chaired by Krasimir Gigov, the general director of the Bulgarian Red Cross, was also established. In January 2021, National Operational Headquarters for the fight against the coronavirus chairman Ventsislav Mutafchiyski specified that election commission members for the upcoming elections will also be considered priority groups for vaccinations. In February 2021, it was confirmed that prosecutors, legal investigators and their staff fall within Phase 3 of the vaccination plan. In the same month the national vaccination plan was further amended to allow for non-priority individuals to receive vaccines even prior to all the priority targets being covered, as long as certain conditions are observed. The issue of vaccine hesitancy in Bulgaria is believed to have played a part in the structuring of the plan. Todor Kantardzhiev stated in a June 2021 interview that if medical personnel had not been prioritized as part of the first phase, many hospitals would not have been able to perform their functions during the spring of 2021.

Order	Priority group	Number eligible (estimated)
1	medical personnel, pharmacists, dentists as well as members of staff in these fields who have assistant functions	243 600
2	staff and customers of social institutions, pedagogical specialists, people working on mink farms	112 080
3	people who are in charge of guaranteeing that activities essential for public life are able to take place (Note: Includes people working in the water supply, energy, and other sectors connected to national security, as well as members of the public administration. The priority group was later expanded to encompass further occupations such a IT professionals and media representatives.)	not specified, will be based on lists compiled in advance
4	all those 65 years of age and over, and clinically vulnerable individuals due to underlying conditions, including immunocompromised and with reduced immunity	1.8 million
5	vulnerable groups from the population due to high epidemiological risk of infection attributable to their way of life (Note: Includes prisoners, people residing in refugee camps and those who are difficult to reach.)	not specified, will be based on lists compiled in advance

== Challenges and logistics ==
On 5 December 2020, the first two ultracold freezers suitable for the storage of the Pfizer–BioNTech COVID-19 vaccine in accordance with the temperature requirements were installed at the Center of Infectious and Parasitic Diseases in the capital. On 7 December, Bourgas became the second city in the country equipped with such a refrigerator, followed by Plovdiv on 9 December and Varna on the 18th. Each freezer can hold more than 100,000 vaccine doses. The Center of Infectious and Parasitic Diseases serves as the main hub for the distribution of the vaccines to the regional health inspectorates.

In December 2021, 69 temporary vaccination points were set up throughout the country for the administering of the pediatric vaccine doses (for children aged from 5 to 11), with Sofia, Plovdiv and Veliko Tarnovo being the hubs for the initial deliveries.

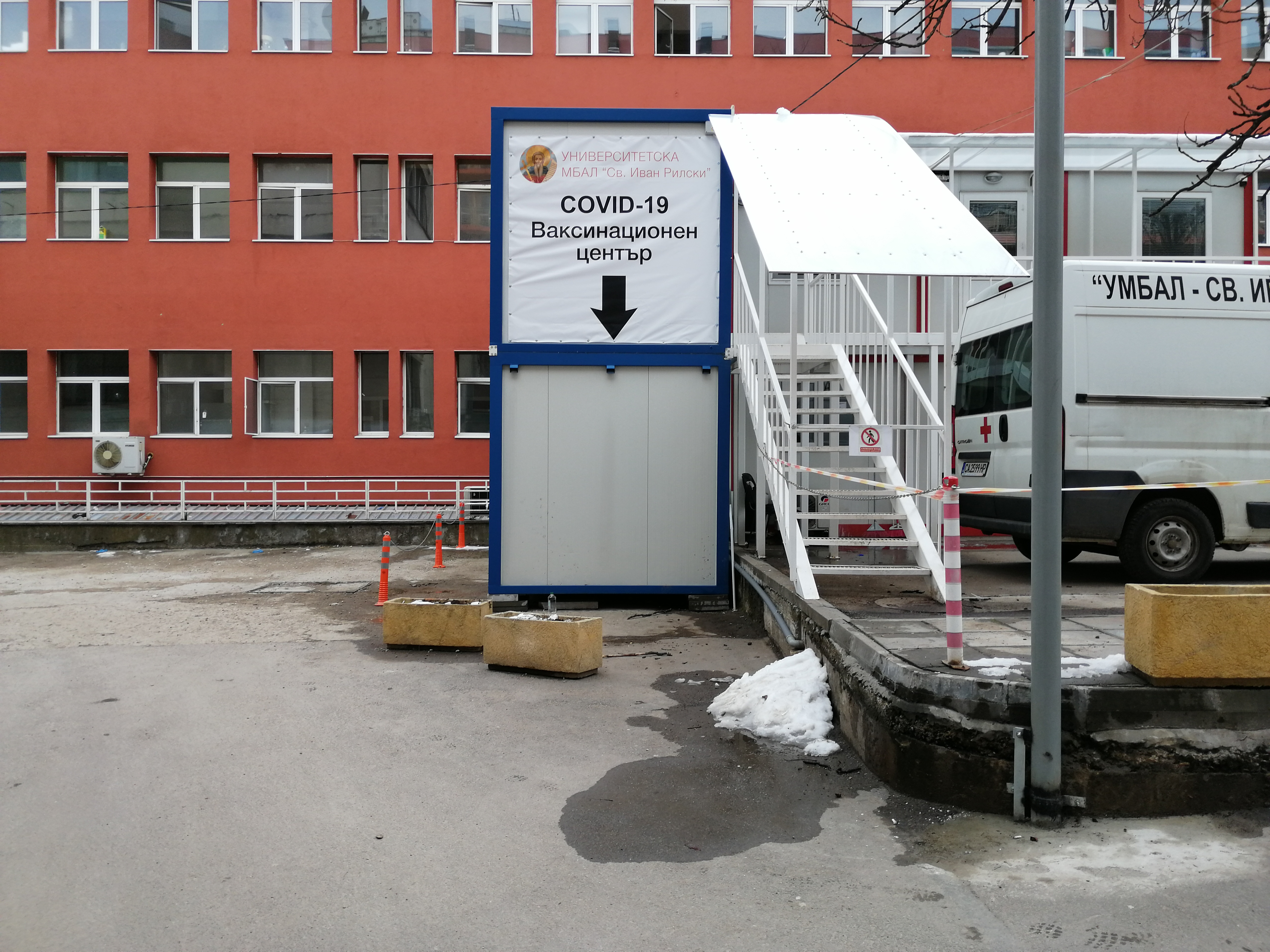
A COVID-19 vaccination point at the University Hospital St. Ivan Rilski in Sofia, the first place in the country to offer 24-hour vaccinations.

The first vaccination site in the country was opened on 15 December 2020, being located in Sofia. On 5 January 2021, four mobile units were set up, so that elderly people living in care homes in Sofia could be vaccinated in their places of residence. Over 40 such vaccination units were expected to cover the whole country. By 20 September 2021, the mobile vaccination units had vaccinated 4274 people who were with impaired mobility or were residing in far flung or isolated places, with 3702 of them with a completed vaccination cycle. As of 1 March 2022, a total of 25,604 people had been vaccinated by members of mobile units, with Burgas Province leading the way with 5648.

As of 18 February 2021, 5 vaccination sites were available at Pirogov Hospital in the capital, with the medical facility also being in a position to provide 2 additional mobile units. The total number of vaccination points for the whole country had reached 352 by 23 February 2021. The first 24-hour vaccination center in the country began operating in Sofia on 21 February 2021, just outside the University Hospital St. Ivan Rilski, followed by one in Plovdiv on 23 February. Mobile vaccination points were positioned at the entrances of a few national parks in Sofia on 29 and 30 May 2021, allowing all willing Bulgarians to receive vaccines, with the practice continuing in Sofia and other cities in the next month. The Regional Health Inspectorate of Plovdiv established open air vaccination sites in the Stolipinovo district from 12 June 2021. Between 8 and 13 June 2021, vaccinations were offered in a number of Varna's shopping malls. A mobile vaccination point inside a bus that is able to accommodate two people at the same time began doing the rounds in Sofia on 16 June 2021. On 19 and 20 June 2021, some of the malls in the capital city hosted mobile vaccination sites, with this practice resuming during the next weekend.

On 7 September 2021, at the insistence of Sofia mayor Yordanka Fandakova, a vaccination point was opened at the NDK Metro Station. Since then, vaccinations have also been offered at a number of other sites within the Sofia Metro.

In September 2021, a mobile vaccination point was opened at the University of National and World Economy.

In October 2021, a mobile vaccination point was set up at Sofia Airport.

Vaccination points were also opened at football stadiums, such as those of Levski Sofia and Botev Vratsa, while Botev Plovdiv and Lokomotiv Plovdiv hosted mobile vaccination units at their football grounds.

In December 2021, over 60 vaccination points were established for the administering of pediatric doses, with Sofia, Plovdiv and Veliko Tarnovo being the three arrival points for their distribution to the whole country.

Pirogov Hospital's immunization center saw the most vaccinations of any medical establishment for the year 2021, with over 50,000 people choosing to be vaccinated there and approximately 75,000 doses administered.

Due to a seriously waning interest in the vaccinations and the government's decision to lift the emergency epidemiological situation on 1 April 2022, the number of available vaccination points in the country was significantly reduced during the spring and summer of 2022.

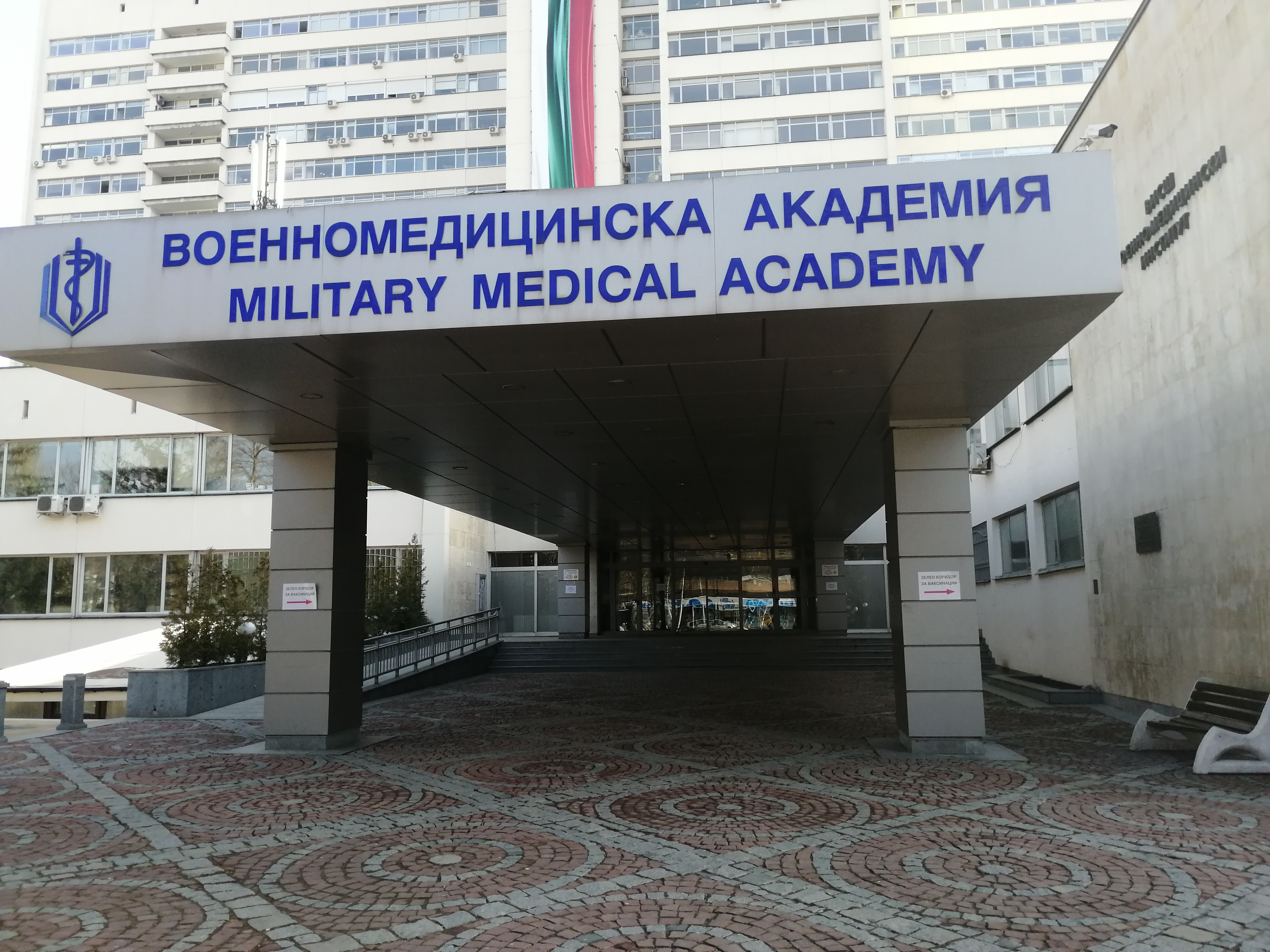
The Military Medical Academy in Sofia where former head of the National Operational Headquarters for the Fight against COVID-19 in Bulgaria Ventsislav Mutafchiyski has personally administered vaccines.

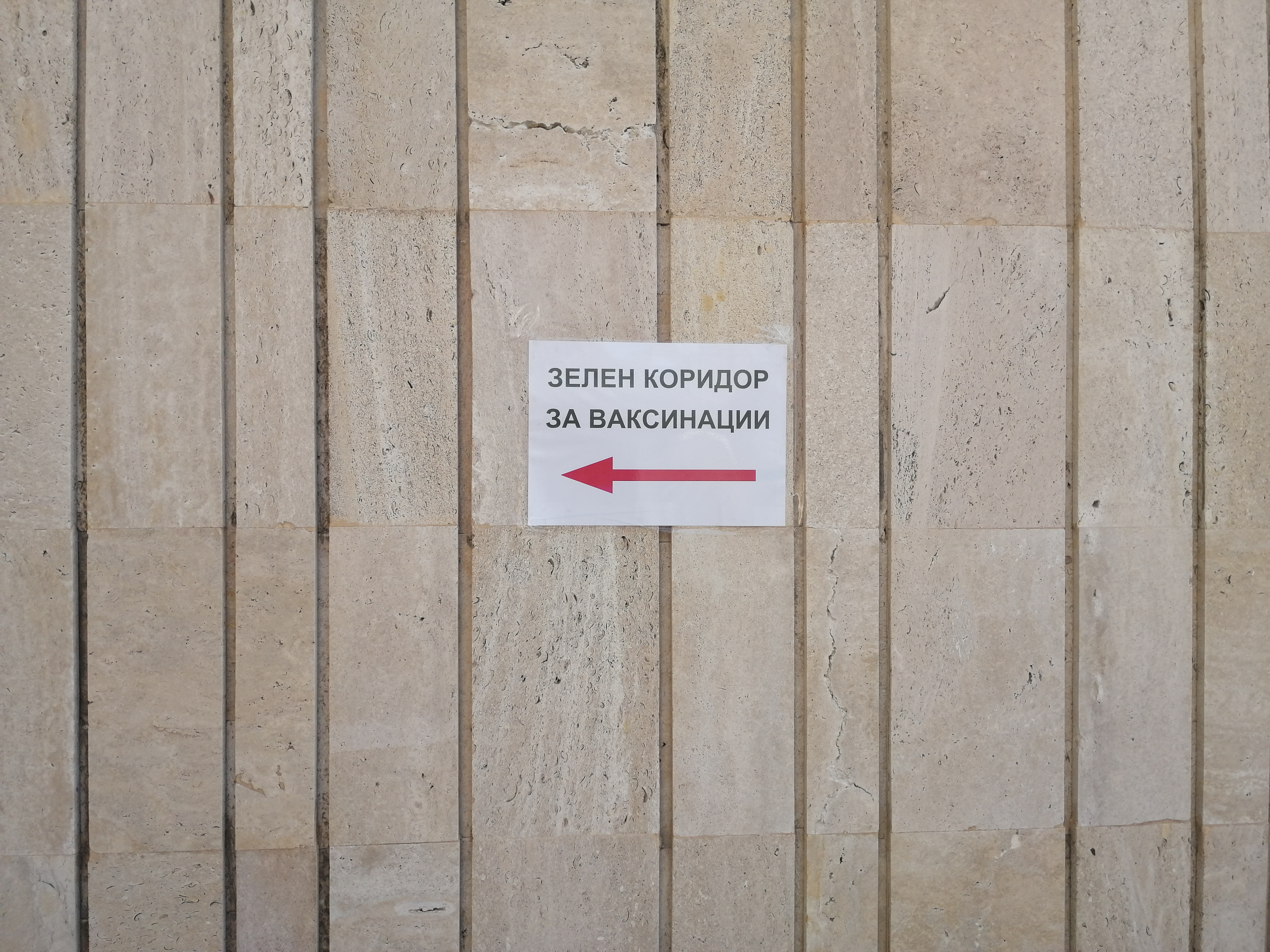
An arrow guiding the people towards a COVID-19 vaccination point in the Military Medical Academy in Sofia during the first mass vaccinations.

== Chronology and vaccination process ==
Bulgaria was allocated 9750 doses of the Pfizer–BioNTech vaccine (sufficient for more than 4000 people) for December 2020 and they arrived in the country on the 26th of the month. Just over 60,000 doses of this vaccine were expected to be available in January 2021.

In early December 2020, President Rumen Radev vowed to get vaccinated only once there are no people waiting in line, while Boyko Borisov stated during the same month that he would have been eager to do it, but had antibodies after recovering from COVID-19 in November 2020. On 27 July 2021, Borisov had himself publicly vaccinated, receiving the first dose of the Moderna vaccine, which has drawn praise. Other prominent members of Borisov's party also underwent the procedure. In August 2021, it was revealed that Radev had been vaccinated as well.

The first person to be vaccinated in Bulgaria was then Minister of Health Kostadin Angelov, which occurred in the morning of 27 December in Sofia. The second was Bulgarian Orthodox Church Bishop Tikhon, followed by a doctor and a nurse. Emanuela Petkova was the first general practitioner to receive a vaccine. Over 1500 people, mostly medical personnel, had been vaccinated by the evening of 28 December. By the late hours of 29 December, close to 3800 people had received a vaccine shot. By the first day of the New Year, the number of vaccinated people had reached 4739.

On 4 January 2021, the first batch of vaccines for this month arrived, numbering approximately 25,000 doses. Unlike in the case of the first delivery of the vaccines, no specialized transport was needed for them, as they were received in boxes with dry ice, which could retain its properties for 5 days. These vaccines were to cover the remaining front line medical personnel from the first phase as well as some social workers, social service users and educators (phase two priority groups).

As of 11 January 2021, (Note: The dates that use the "as of" formulation cover the number of vaccine shots administered up to the evening hours of the previous day, but may not reflect the most recent figures when it comes to the date that is mentioned, e.g. as of 11 January includes the vaccines used up to the evening of 10 January, though it may not provide the most current information with regard to the vaccination status of the population as of the late hours of 11 January.) 13,473 people had been vaccinated.

The first Moderna vaccine doses reached the country on 13 January 2021, numbering 2400 and designated for priority groups in Sofia. Тhe vaccinations with Moderna commencеd on the next day, with obstetrician Sofia Yordanova being the first one to receive it.

As of 13 January 2021, approximately 16,500 vaccine shots had been administered.

As of 27 January 2021, Bulgaria had vaccinated less than 35,000 citizens, which corresponded to 0.47 per 100 people, putting it in last place on a per capita basis among EU countries.

Between 27 January and 30 January 2021, some residents and staff of care homes for elderly people in Sofia received their injections, though a substantial number opted out.

As of 30 January 2021, 40,805 jabs had been administered, with 12,949 people receiving two doses.

On 1 February 2021, educators and staff at kindergartens and schools began to be vaccinated.

As of 4 February 2021, 94,920 vaccines had been delivered and 50,124 vaccine doses had been used, with 16,433 people having undergone the two-step vaccination process.

On 6 February 2021, the first doses of Oxford-AstraZeneca, numbering 28,800, made their arrival in the country. They began to be put to use on the next day, kickstarting Bulgaria's third phase of the vaccination campaign, which was to include members of the Central Electoral Commission and other people in charge of the procedural matters concerning the elections. One of the first to receive it was 76-year-old Ilina Bineva, an employee at the pharmaceutical company BulBio.

On 8 February 2021, the National Vaccination Operational Headquarters announced that all of the so far delivered AstraZeneca vaccines will be used for administering the first doses to people, in order to cover larger segments of the population and speed up the vaccination campaign.

On 19 February 2021, in what was regarded as the beginning of the mass vaccinations, Boyko Borisov ordered (after discussions with members of the National Vaccination Operational Headquarters, the National Operational Headquarters for the fight against the coronavirus, and the Health Minister) that "green corridors" be established alongside the fourth phase of the vaccination plan, allowing all adult citizens who do not fall within the priority groups to visit a vaccination point on Saturday, Sunday or the afternoon hours of working days without the need for a prior appointment and receive a first dose of the AstraZeneca vaccine. The people who preferred one of the two approved RNA vaccines were to register at the Military Medical Academy and wait for a follow-up call once Pfizer-BioNTech or Moderna doses are available. The Prime Minister insisted that at least 10,000 people are to be vaccinated per day. Borisov's decision was viewed as in practice resulting in the abandonment of the phased approach to vaccinations. The U-turn in the government's policies has been attributed to the need to expedite the vaccination process and the vaccine reservations displayed by members of priority groups such as medical practitioners and educators, with only 24% of the latter expressing a wish to be vaccinated. The changed approach sped up the tempo of the vaccinations, with more than 30,000 doses administered in the first three days since the opening of the "green corridors".

However, while medical practitioners carried on with the vaccinations, even if at a reduced pace, in a number of smaller cities, between 25 and 28 February the "green corridors" were temporarily discontinued in Sofia and other large cities because of the country mostly running out of AstraZeneca vaccines, with the remaining Pfizer-BioNTech and Moderna ones set aside for priority groups.

After the arrival and distribution of 52,800 Oxford-AstraZeneca doses, the vaccinations involving non-priority targets resumed on 28 February. In contrast to the previous days, they saw a significantly more active role of the general practitioners than of the health inspectorates and the large hospitals, proceeding only if there are no people from phases 1-4 willing to be vaccinated.

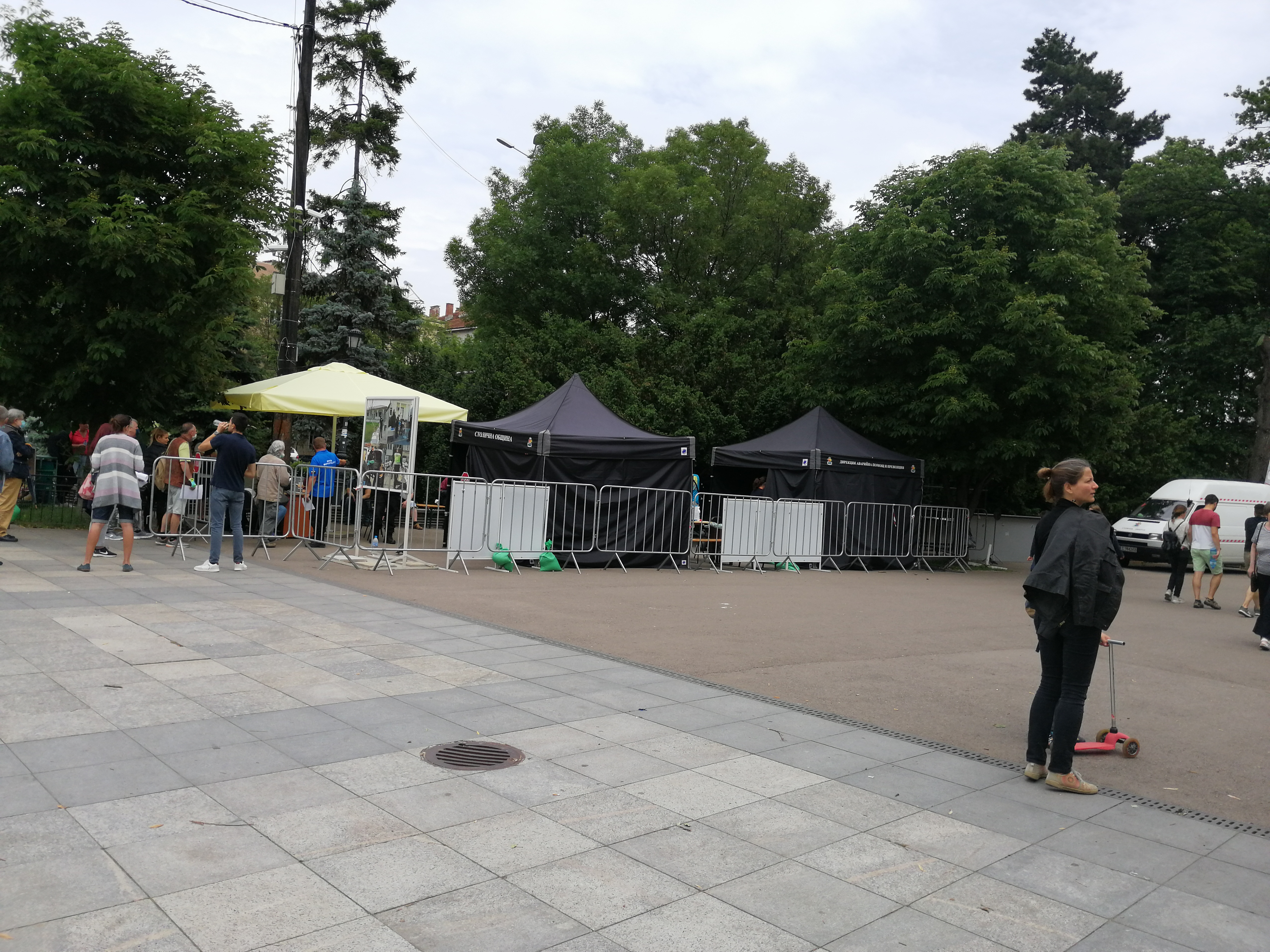
A long-distance view of a mobile vaccination point against COVID-19 in the Borisova gradina in Sofia.

On 8 March 2021, the Health Ministry took the decision to distribute a larger quantity of vaccines for the provinces where the infection rate is higher, such as Kyustendil.

On 11 March 2021, the people who had registered via the electronic system for vaccinations began receiving their injections, with all of them covered by either a Pfizer-BioNTech or a Moderna vaccine between 12 and 18 March due to a safety concern pertaining to AstraZeneca. However, the booking of slots via the electronic registration system was put on hold, as the bulk of the vaccinations were to be with AstraZeneca. Vaccinations with the adenovirus vector vaccine resumed on 19 March, with the electronic registration option for new users restored on 20 March.

During the month of March a significant number of physicians and teachers (falling within the first two phases of the vaccination plan) who had initially not made use of their priority status expressed a wish to be vaccinated.

The month of April saw a much reduced interest in the AstraZeneca vaccine among the members of the general public, with a strong preference for the RNA vaccines. As a result of the plummeting popularity of AstraZeneca, described as sinking to "symbolic percentages" by the Health Minister, Kostadin Angelov stated on 12 April 2021 that Bulgaria will withdraw the vaccine from the vaccination programme if the enthusiasm for it reaches rock bottom.

On 6 April 2021, general practitioners began receiving flasks of RNA vaccines for their patients, though the quantities were limited.

On 15 April 2021, the first doses of Janssen, numbering 14,400, were delivered to Bulgaria, but they remained in storage, as the National Vaccination Operational Headquarters in Bulgaria had not yet made a decision as to their use after the U.S. Centers for Disease Control and Prevention (CDC) and Food and Drug Administration (FDA) had earlier begun investigations of very rare cases of cerebral venous sinus thrombosis associated with this vaccine, with EMA also reviewing the matter.

On 26 April 2021, Chief Health Inspector Angel Kunchev confirmed that Bulgaria will give the green light to the Johnson & Johnson vaccine and it may be especially useful for vaccinating certain groups, such as those employed within the tourism sector as well as demographics that are less easily reachable like the Romani people. Vaccinations with this one-dose vaccine officially began on 28 April 2021, even though a limited number of doses of Johnson & Johnson had already been administered to selected target groups in the preceding days.

"Green corridors", mainly with RNA vaccines, were opened up on 30 April, to be in operation until 9 May 2021. Over 125,000 people managed to make use of them during these 10 days. On 10 May, it was confirmed that they would be extended, as there was a sufficient quantity of vaccines (more than 270 000 doses of Pfizer vaccines had arrived on that date). On the same day, people who had specifically indicated a preference for RNA vaccines from the electronic system began receiving them. Johnson & Johnson was initially not be offered as part of the "green corridors", but it eventually started to be administered in that fashion as well.

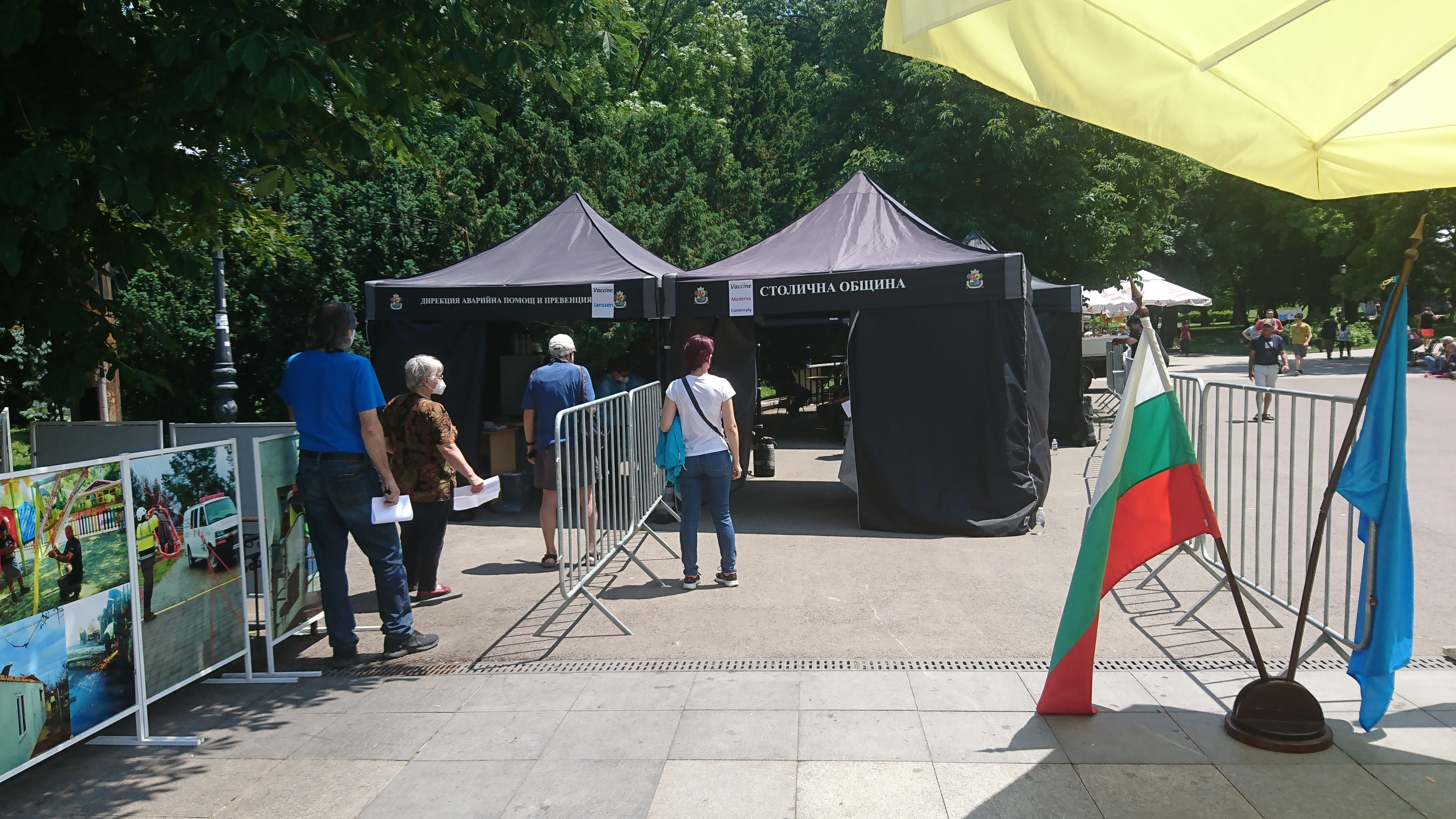
A closer view of a mobile vaccination point against COVID-19 in the Borisova gradina in Sofia.

The fifth phase of the vaccination plan began in May 2021.

On 8 May 2021, approximately 38,000 people were vaccinated, the highest number in a single day.

The milestone of 1 million administered doses of vaccines had been reached by 12 May 2021, with 362,322 people fully immunized.

On 17 May 2021, caretaker Health Minister Stoycho Katsarov who has been sharply critical of his predecessor due to the non-inclusion of elderly people in the first phase of the vaccination plan, issued a decree stipulating that only people over the age of 60 and/or those with chronic conditions are to receive injections at the different vaccination points from Monday to Thursday. Following strong disapproval from Kostadin Angelov and public figures such as crisis management expert Petar Velkov, who viewed this measure as pointless due to enough vaccines being available for everyone, and entailing a risk of further slowing down of the general vaccination process, Katsarov amended the decree on the next day, stating that while vulnerable people will still be prioritized, those under 60 and/or without chronic illnesses will not to be turned away if they decide to make use of a "green corridor" on one of the first four days of the week.

As of 25 May 2021, 2.8 million vaccine doses had been delivered to Bulgaria, of which under 1.3 million had been administered, while the amount of vaccines received by the country exceeded 3.5 million by the end of the month, with Pfizer-BioNTech constituting the bulk of them.

May 2021 was also the first month during which the number of injected first doses of vaccines was lower than in the preceding one.

In June 2021, the Ministry of Health gave the green light for the vaccination of children aged 12 and over with the Pfizer-BioNTech vaccine.

On 12 June 2021, the caretaker Health Minister himself was himself immunized with a Janssen COVID-19 vaccine.

As of mid June 2021, 36 children between the ages of 12 and 15 had been vaccinated, with few parents expressing an interest.

The summer months saw a seriously dwindling interest in the vaccinations, though there was a small uptick in August.

By 25 August 2021, 7130 school pupils over the age of 12 had been fully vaccinated while 11,688 had received one dose, with close to 10,000 expected to have completed their vaccination courses by 15 September.

On 23 September 2021, the expert group of the Ministry of Health recommended a third vaccine dose, using Pfizer–BioNTech, for people who are immunocompromised, are living in care homes, are health care workers, are aged over 65 as well as those satisfying other health-related criteria, including low virus-specific antibodies or immune cells, to be administered six to eight months after a completed vaccination course, with the possibility of this happening as soon as one month after a completed vaccination cycle in case the immunity generated is not sufficient.

On 24 September 2021, Ventsislav Mutafchiyski and 11 other physicians from The Military Medical Academy received a third shot from the vaccine.

On 30 September 2021, the Ministry of Health clarified that all Bulgarians, including those who do not fall within the five priority groups, are eligible for the booster dose, as long as sufficient time has passed since the completion of their original vaccination course. 890 third doses had been administered up to that date.

On 19 October 2021, the Health Minister announced that from 21 October a "green certificate", entailing proof of vaccination, recovery from an infection or a negative COVID-19 test will be required for all public activities taking place indoors. The announcement resulted in a significant increase in the number of people interested in getting a vaccine, many opting for the one-shot Janssen. On 21 October, it was clarified that a temporary green certificate will also be issued to people who have had one injection in the case of a two-dose regimen. Since 11 November 2021, green certificates valid for three months can also be issued to people following a quantity anti SARS-CoV-2 IgG test, showing values exceeding 150 BAU/ml.

Close to 360,000 vaccine doses were administered in the first three weeks since the announcement regarding the "green certificate" requirement, with a rising vaccine uptake among educators and school pupils.

As of 18 November 2021, 28,331 doses had been administered to children aged from 12 to 17, with 12,136 with a completed vaccination course and 16,195 with one injection.

On 20 December 2021, the first pediatric doses (for children between the ages of 5 and 11 years) of the Pfizer-BioNTech vaccines arrived in Bulgaria. The vaccinations in this age group began on 21 December in Veliko Tarnovo before commencing on the next day in Sofia and other cities.

On 30 December 2021, the health authorities announced that the time interval for the administering of a booster dose will be shortened to three months for the people with a two-dose vaccine regimen while those with the one-shot Janssen vaccine will be able to receive it two months after the first injection. This new regulation does not apply to children. This decision has been attributed to the vaccine evading properties of the Omicron variant whose presence was already suspected in Bulgaria at the time.

January 2022 saw a notable rise in the number of people visiting the vaccination centers, though a significant proportion of them were there for receiving their booster doses and there was a reversal of this trend during the second half of the month and in February 2022.

By early February 2022, 2 million citizens had been fully vaccinated.

As of 12 February 2022, the capital city of Sofia had the highest vaccination coverage, with 41.93% of the people fully vaccinated while Montana Province had the lowest at 19.29%.

Starting from 24 February 2022, the rules for the green certificate began to be relaxed, with public establishments allowed to decide on their own accord whether to demand such a pass for their visitors, with the requirement remaining in place for employees and staff. The regulations pertaining to green passes for patrons of "establishments of societal importance" were further loosened from 10 March.

As of 1 March 2022, more than 80% of physicians had been fully vaccinated, the highest of any occupation.

On 17 March 2022, the Ministry of Health announced that from 21 March the green pass will no longer be required for any activities.

On 1 April 2022, the Council of Ministers lifted the emergency epidemiological situation, approximately two years after it was introduced. The decision was met with skepticism by some experts due to the still low vaccination rate in the country.

In April 2022, it was confirmed by the authorities that Ukrainian citizens who have received temporary protection in Bulgaria will be eligible to be vaccinated for free.

As of 6 April 2022, 5,779,500 Pfizer-BioNTech, 958,100 Moderna, 4,518,400 AstraZeneca and 1,777,300 Janssen doses had been delivered to Bulgaria.

On 24 June 2022, the Ministry of Health approved the proposals of the expert council on the overview of immunoprophylaxis, allowing a second booster (with one of the two RNA vaccines) for all people aged 18 and over. The second booster dose may be administered at least four months after the first one in the case of people whose completed vaccination cycle involving a two-dose regimen and is strongly advised for those belonging to high risk groups.

On 27 June 2022, when the decision entered into force, 204 people received second booster doses.

As of 1 September 2022, 53,401 vaccine doses had been administered in the 12-17 age group and 4498 in the 5 to 11 age cohort.

On 12 September 2022, the first Omicron-adapted COVID-19 vaccines arrived in Bulgaria, with 290,880 Comirnaty Original/Omicron BA.1 and 1800 Spikevax Bivalent Original/Omicron BA.1 being delivered. Moderna's vaccine for the Omicron strain is only administered in specific immunization cabinets and was initially not available in most hospital settings.

In late October 2022, 10,200 doses of the Valneva vaccine were delivered to Bulgaria.

In January 2023, the three-dose Pfizer–BioNTech vaccine for children in the age bracket from 6 months to 4 years old and the new Sanofi vaccine, to be used as a booster, became available in Bulgaria.

Between 27 September and 23 October 2023, over 66,000 people had been vaccinated with the new vaccines targeting the XBB 1.5 strain of Omicron.

Percentage of vaccinated according to the vaccine received (as of 31 May 2022)
1. Pfizer–BioNTech (66.0%)
2. Moderna (11.3%)
3. Oxford-AstraZeneca (10.9%)
4. Janssen (11.8%)

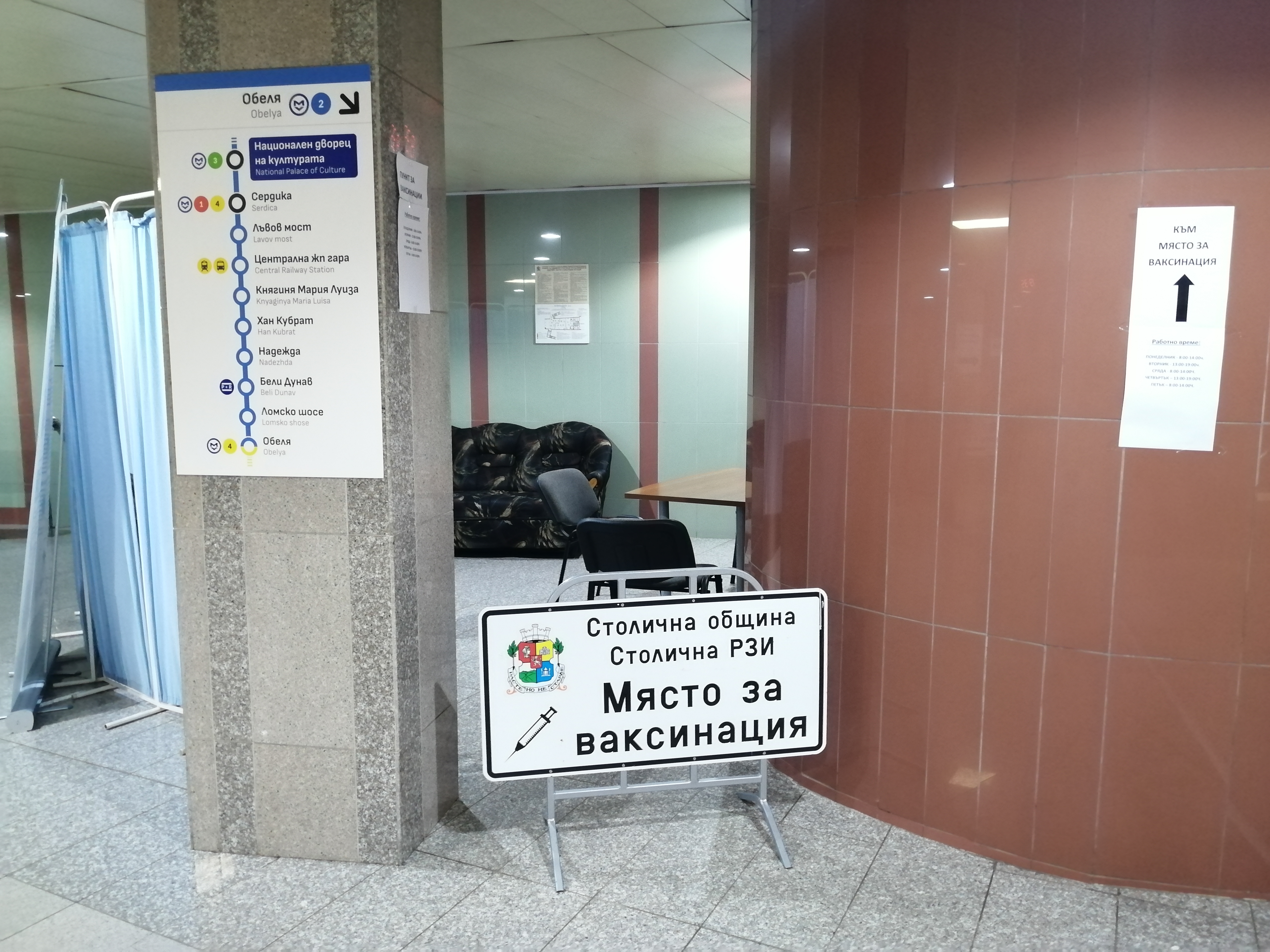
The COVID-19 vaccination point located in the NDK Metro Station in Sofia.

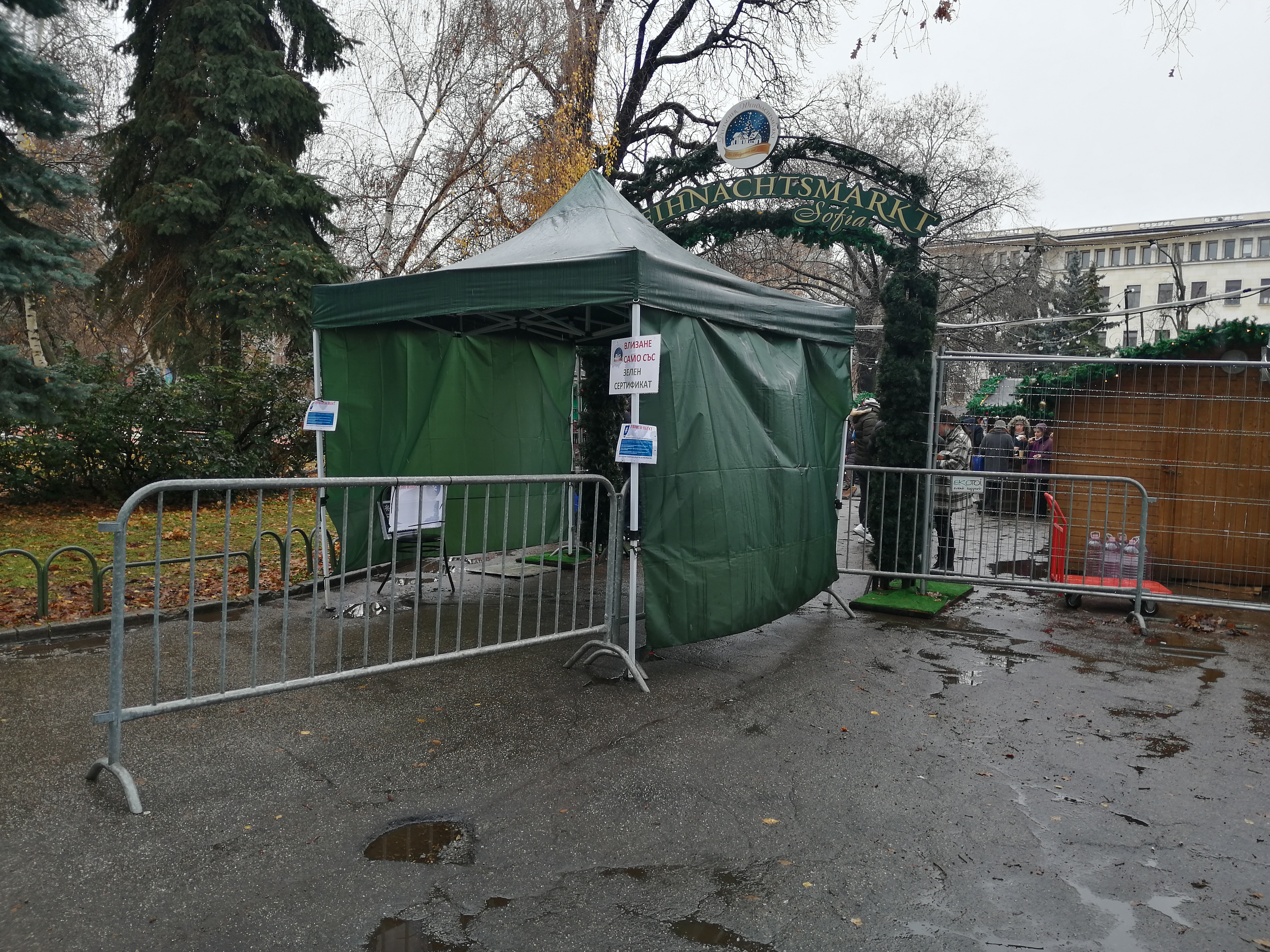
The Christmas market in Sofia, one of the outdoor venues that required a green certificate.

== Number of vaccinations by vaccine type ==
The numbers refer to total doses administered, broken down by vaccine manufacturer. (As of 30 July 2022, drawing on information from the plusmen.bg webpage)

View source data.

== Public vaccinations ==
Listed here are individuals who had their actual vaccination procedure captured on video, posted photos from the place in which their vaccine was administered or were subject to a media announcement of such nature for the purpose of popularizing the vaccination campaign.

Individual	Occupation	Date (Note: Indicates the date on which the first dose was administered in the case of two-shot vaccines, unless noted otherwise.)	Vaccine	Notes	Reference (s)
Kostadin Angelov	Minister of Health, 2020-2021	27 December 2020	Pfizer–BioNTech	First Bulgarian to be vaccinated	
Tikhon Tiveriopolski	Bulgarian Orthodox Church Bishop	27 December 2020	Pfizer–BioNTech		
Rada Prokopova	Physician, head cardiologist at St. Anna Hospital	27 December 2020	Pfizer–BioNTech	First physician to be vaccinated	
Ivan Madzharov	Chairman of the Bulgarian Medical Association	27 December 2020	Pfizer–BioNTech		
Ventsislav Mutafchiyski	Military doctor, COVID-19 taskforce chief, 2020-2021	27 December 2020	Pfizer–BioNTech	Also received a booster dose	
Asen Baltov	Physician, head of Pirogov Hospital	27 December 2020	Pfizer–BioNTech	Had previously recovered from COVID-19	
Krasimir Gigov	Head of the Vaccinаtion Coordination Council, 2020-2021	27 December 2020	Pfizer–BioNTech		
Hristo Petrov (Itso Hazarta)	Rapper, politician	Spring 2021	Pfizer–BioNTech	Also shared antibody results two weeks after the second vaccine dose	
Hristo Stoichkov	Footballer, manager	2021	Not specified	Recovered from COVID-19 and subsequently also received a booster dose, strongly appealed to his compatriots to get themselves vaccinated	
Mustafa Karadaya	Chairman of MRF, 2016-	16 April 2021	not specified	Also received a booster dose	
Stoycho Katsarov	Caretaker Minister of Health, 2021	12 June 2021	Janssen	Recovered from COVID-19; Also received a Pfizer-BioNTech booster dose	
Boyko Borisov	Prime Minister, 2009–2013, 2014–2017, 2017–2021	27 July 2021	Moderna	Had previously recovered from COVID-19; Also received a booster dose	
Tomislav Donchev	Politician	27 July 2021	Moderna		
Delyan Dobrev	Politician	27 July 2021	Pfizer–BioNTech	Had previously recovered from COVID-19	
Mladen Marinov	Politician, jurist	27 July 2021	not specified	Had previously recovered from COVID-19	
Anna Alexandrova	Politician	27 July 2021	not specified	Had previously recovered from COVID-19	
Delyan Peevski	Politician, entrepreneur	22 October 2021 (Note: Third dose.)	not specified		
Yordan Tsonev	Politician, deputy chairman of MRF	22 October 2021	not specified		
Radoslav Revanski	Politician, mayor of Belitsa	22 October 2021	not specified		
Ahmed Ahmedov	Politician, deputy chairman of MRF	16 November 2021 (Note: Third dose.)	not specified		
Stanislav Anastasov	Politician, deputy chairman of MRF	16 November 2021	not specified		
Halil Letifov	Politician, deputy chairman of MRF	16 November 2021	not specified		
Iskra Mihaylova	Politician, MEP	16 November 2021	not specified		
Atidzhe Alieva-Veli	Politician, MEP	16 November 2021	not specified		
Uti Bachvarov	Actor, TV host, professional cook	14 December 2021	Moderna	Had previously recovered from COVID-19	
Rumen Radev	President, 2017-	6 January 2022 (Note: Third dose.)	not specified		

== Medical aspects pertaining to the vaccinations ==
=== General considerations ===
Asparouh Iliev, a Bulgarian specialist in molecular neuroinfectiology from the University of Bern, has praised the two RNA vaccines, characterizing them as extremely safe and also regarding them as very similar to each other. He has pointed out that the AstraZeneca vaccine has an excellent safety profile and may actually be offering even better protection than shown from the preliminary studies, considering the whole comparison exercise between the three vaccines to be pointless, urging people to take up the opportunity to get themselves vaccinated, with allergist Bogdan Petrunov maintaining that AstraZeneca is in no way inferior to the RNA vaccines.

In April 2021, pulmonologist Kosta Kostov, while acknowledging the issue of vaccine reservations in Bulgaria, also stated that the narrative that all approved vaccines on the EU level are equally safe and effective is fallacious.

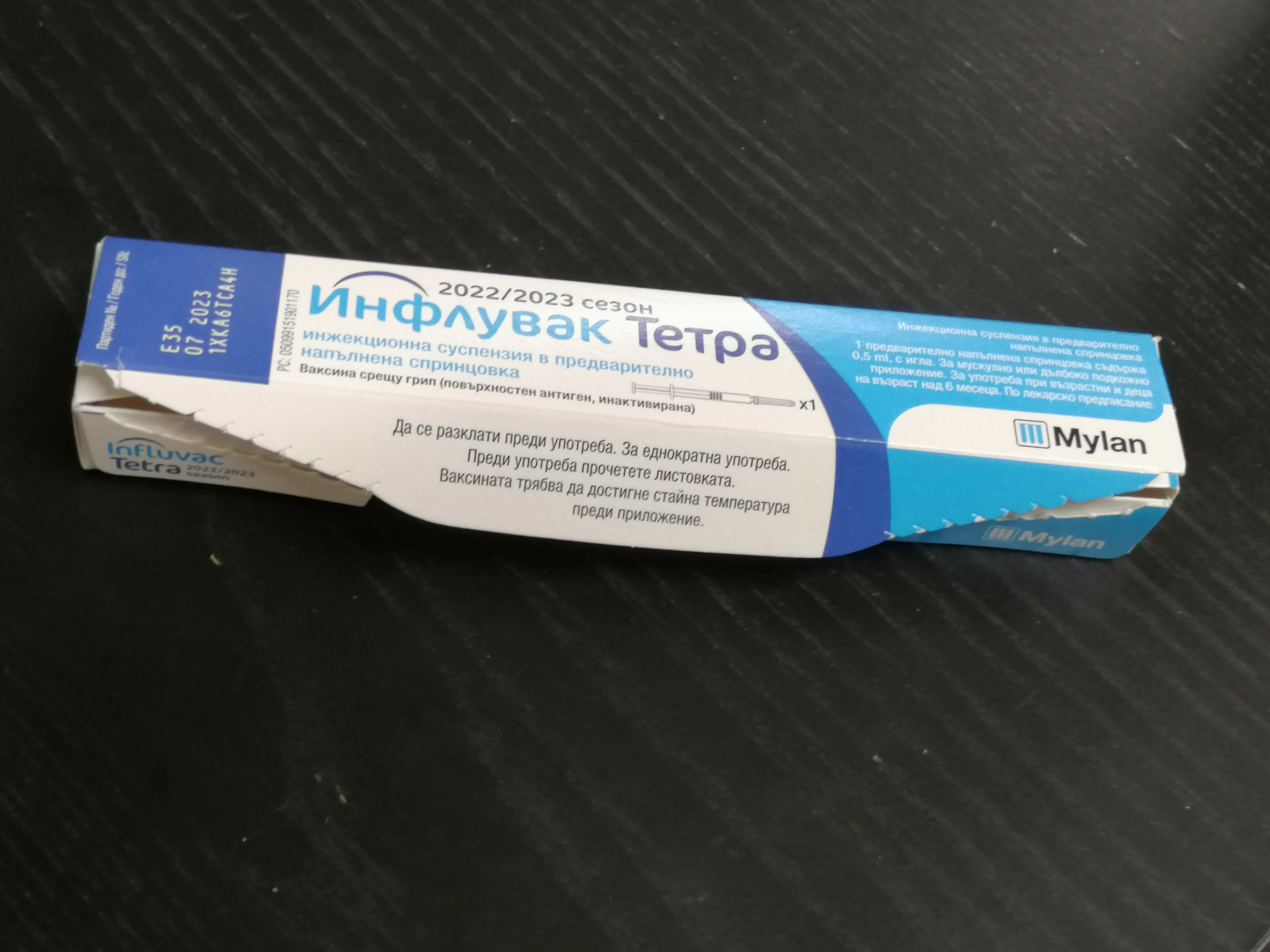
An influenza vaccine to be used in Bulgaria during the autumn and winter of 2022.

Andrey Chorbanov, a member of the Institute of Microbiology at BAS and a leading figure behind the ongoing development of the Bulgarian vaccine, while supportive of vaccinating vulnerable groups, maintains that naturally acquired immunity is much stronger than the vaccine-induced one, believing that the people who have recovered from COVID-19 have very durable immunity and has opposed mandatory vaccinations against COVID-19 for young and healthy people. In his view, the major question mark surrounding the vaccines remains their actual effectiveness while their safety and the side effects are not an issue. Similarly, immunologist Velizar Shivarov affirms that people who have antibodies can afford to wait to be vaccinated. In February 2021, Todor Kantardzhiev, a member of the National Operational Headquarters for the fight against the coronavirus in Bulgaria, claimed that one vaccine dose may be sufficient for the people who have recovered from a COVID-19 infection and has also expressed the viewpoint that a person who gets infected between the two jabs may not need the second injection. Allergist Bogdan Petrunov and neuroinfectiology practitioner Asparouh Iliev have contested Chorbanov's claims, emphasizing that vaccine-induced immunity is significantly more reliable than the naturally acquired one, especially with regard to the mutant strains of the virus, thus offering a greater breadth of protection, even if infection-generated immunity can be quite strong.

People who have recovered from COVID-19 may undergo the two-dose vaccination process no earlier than 3 months after the laboratory confirmation of their diagnosis.

In the case of citizens who become infected after receiving their first injection (in the case of two-shot vaccines), the second dose of the vaccine is to be administered at least 6 months after the laboratory diagnosis has become official.

The recommendations of the National Vaccination Operational Headquarters in Bulgaria are that the second dose of the Oxford-AstraZeneca vaccine be administered at least 10 weeks after the first.

The mixing of different types of vaccines, especially when it comes to attempting to complete the second step of the vaccination process by using another vaccine, was initially not advised, but was still considered a possibility, depending on the conclusions of further studies and there are currently indications that combining AstraZeneca and Pfizer may generate a more powerful immune response, as adenovirus vaccines tend to be superior in stimulating T cell responses while RNA ones produce higher antibody levels. Virologist Radostina Aleksandrova notes that the protective antibody titers as a result of the mixing of these vaccines can be up to six times higher, though cautions that the sample sizes in terms of study participants have been small and there are some uncertainties regarding the efficacy and safety.

In April 2021 the Health Minister clarified that Oxford-AstraZeneca will not be administered to women under the age of 60 with an elevated risk for thrombosis and/or a history of thrombocytopenia. Chief Health Inspector Angel Kunchev stated that women under 30 who are heavy smokers, take contraceptives and are overweight are the most at risk for blood clots. The people who have received the first dose of this vaccine without experiencing any serious adverse effects may complete the vaccination process with the same one while those who do not wish so may choose one of the two RNA vaccines for their second jab, but no earlier than 84 days after the first Oxford-AstraZeneca injection. Bulgaria had previously also considered combining the AstraZeneca and Johnson & Johnson vaccines. As of 10 May 2021, it was reported that very few of the people who were due their second dose had decided to pick a RNA vaccine instead of AstraZeneca. On 26 August 2021, it was revealed that approximately 3000 Bulgarians had opted to take a RNA vaccine as their second dose.

Immunologist Bogdan Petrunov has recommended that Bulgarians also get the flu vaccine in addition to a COVID-19 one. In Bulgaria a number of medical practitioners advise that there is at least a ten-day to a two-week interval between the administering of a flu and a COVID-19 vaccine. However, both shots can also be received simultaneously, according to autumn 2022 guidelines from the Ministry of Health, which are consistent with the advice of the European Commission and the WHO. The country bought 190,000 influenza vaccines for the period between October 2022 and February 2023.

=== Pre-vaccination and immediate aftermath ===
According to experts, there is no need for a person who is asymptomatic or mildly symptomatic to be tested for COVID-19 prior to getting the vaccine. A person who has been vaccinated is generally recommended to be kept for observation for 15–20 minutes in the rare case any potential side effects need to be managed. People who want to receive a booster dose do not need to be tested for antibodies. In October 2021, the Ministry of Health published further information regarding the contraindications to an immunization with Pfizer-BioNTech - having a severe allergy to a component of the vaccine, belonging to an age group below that specified in the short characteristics of the vaccine and being in isolation or showing symptoms of COVID-19. Due to the low vaccination rate, caretaker health minister Asen Medzhidiev stated in August 2022 that medical practitioners will be allowed to open multiple dose vials of the Pfizer-BioNTech vaccine even if there is only one person present who is wishing to be vaccinated.

=== Post-vaccination ===
As of 4 January 2021, only 4 adverse reactions to the vaccines administered had been reported to the Executive Agency for Medicines - they included headaches and muscle pain, with all of the recipients' symptoms quickly subsiding. As of 12 March 2021, slightly over 830 messages regarding unwelcome side effects had been filed. As of 19 March 2021, about 1200 such reports had been submitted, with the frequency being 4 for every 1000 vaccinated for AstraZeneca, 3 for every 1000 individuals for Moderna, and slightly over 2 per 1000 for Pfizer. According to other sources, the frequency of such complaints for all three vaccines was roughly 3.2 for every 1000 shots administered, with high fever (over 38 degrees Celsius) seen as a more typical side effect of AstraZeneca. As of 17 January 2022, 3861 complaints had been posted, with 10% of them assessed to meet the seriousness criteria, and no fatal outcomes conclusively proven to have been linked to vaccines. The latter clarification was made largely in response to allegations made by controversial infectiologist Atanas Mangarov who had made statements suggesting that there had been fatalities attributable to the vaccines. As of 3 May 2022, 4069 such messages had been submitted, equivalent to a frequency of 0.92 post-vaccination effects per 1000 doses. As of 1 September 2022, 4176 such notifications had been received, equaling the same ratio of 0.92 vaccine-related grievances per 1000 doses. As of 24 November 2022, 4188 such reports had been posted, equivalent to 0.91 per 1000 doses.

Bogdan Kirilov, the executive director of the Bulgarian Drug Agency, noted that all of the serious adverse reactions in the case of AstraZeneca had occurred after the first dose. According to a Ministry of Health report from October 2021, side effects are more frequent after the second dose in the case of RNA vaccines, with high fever being rare. Todor Kantardzhiev stated in January 2021 that the side effects of the COVID-19 vaccines are no different from those of the influenza vaccines.

In March 2021, a number of EU countries temporarily suspended vaccinations with Oxford AstraZeneca after reports of fatal or life-threatening blood clots with low platelet counts in a few people who had recently received a dose, even though no direct causal link has been established with the vaccine. Bulgaria is among the 17 EU recipients of vaccines that are part of the ABV5300 batch, which has been under investigation by the Austrian health authorities as well as by the European Medicines Agency (EMA). Bulgaria had received 31 200 doses from this batch on 12 February, with most of them administered, but no serious adverse effects were reported until 12 March. Bogdan Kirilov, the executive director of the Bulgarian Drug Agency, initially stated that the country intended to continue the vaccination process as planned. However, on 12 March 2021, Boyko Borisov ordered that vaccinations with AstraZeneca be halted until a written opinion is provided by EMA, clearing all doubts regarding the vaccine's safety. As a result, Kirilov mandated that all of the AstraZeneca doses in the country are temporarily blocked from distribution and use. The decision had also been influenced by the reported fatality of a 57-year-old woman from Plovdiv with multiple comorbidities shortly after vaccination. On 18 March 2021, EMA released a statement that it still considers the benefit-risk balance of the vaccine to be positive. It was also determined that no thrombosis had been observed in the case of the 57-year-old Bulgarian citizen. AstraZeneca vaccinations recommenced in Bulgaria on the next day. On 21 May 2021, EMA introduced a contraindication for a second shot of AstraZeneca in the case of blood clots with low blood platelets (thrombosis with thrombocytopenia syndrome) occurring after the first injection and on 11 June 2021 issued a warning against the administering of this vaccine to people with capillary leak syndrome.

After a similar issue halted the distribution of Johnson & Johnson, on 20 April 2021, EMA confirmed that it had discovered a link between the vaccine and instances of very rarely occurring unusual blood clots with low blood platelets, stating that the product information should contain such a warning while also assessing the benefit-risk balance to be in favour of the vaccine.

From 25 May 2022, the time interval for children aged 12 to 17 in which they can receive a Pfizer-BioNTech booster dose after completing their regular vaccination regimen with the same vaccine was shortened from six to three months.

Leading immunological laboratories in the country will be monitoring at least 1000 Bulgarians for a period of two years in order to assess the nature and durability of their immunity to COVID-19.

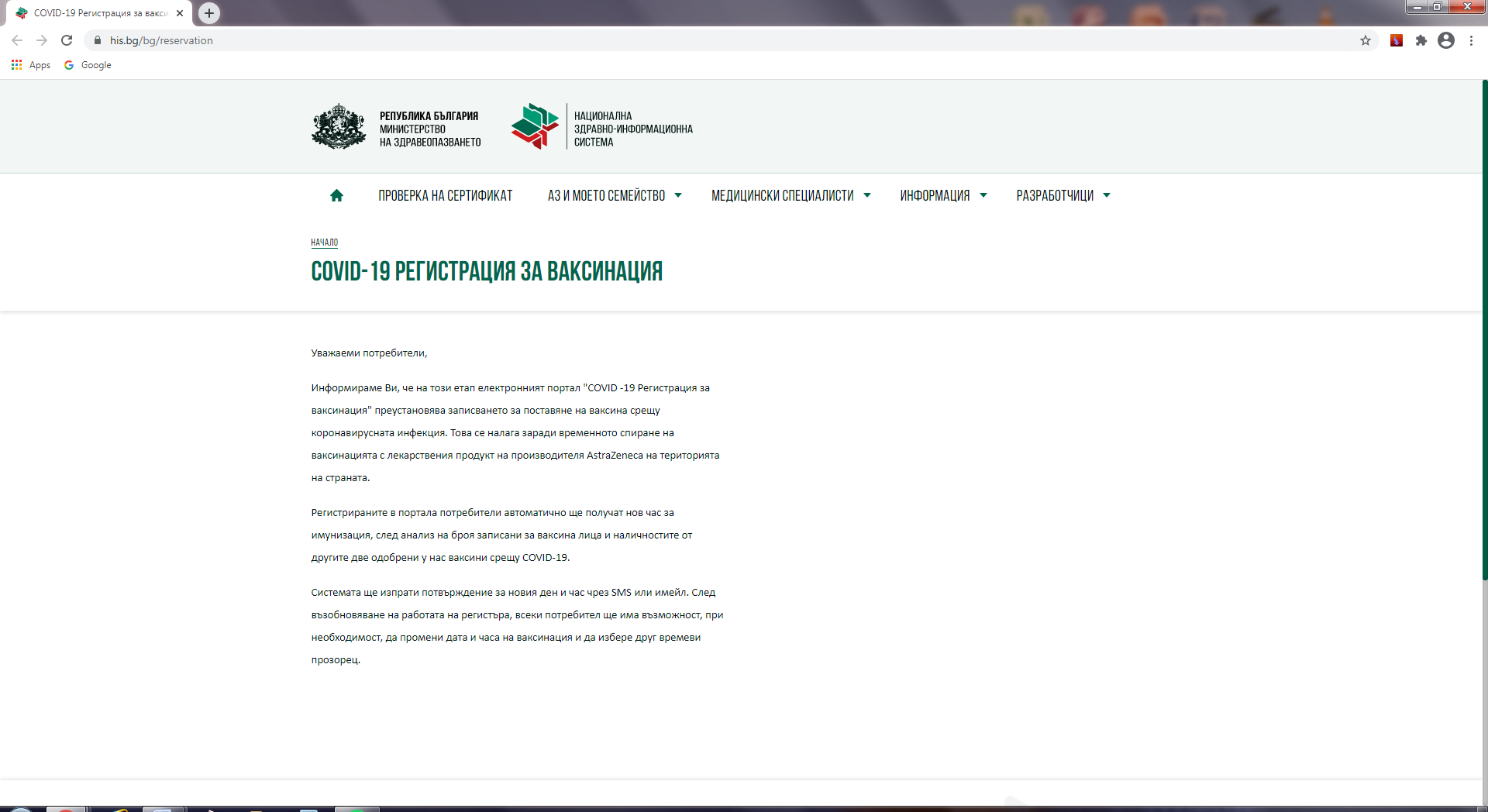
A screenshot from the electronic registration system after vaccinations with Oxford-AstraZeneca were temporarily put to a halt.

== Procedures relating to the vaccinations ==
Vaccination is voluntary and free for all citizens. The issuing of the vaccination certificate will also be at no cost for the citizen. The medical professionals administering vaccines are paid 10 leva per injection by the state. While the process had unofficially begun as early as December 2020, in late January 2021, many citizens started signing up for vaccinations with their general practitioners, with an online registration system beginning to function on 4 March 2021. More than 40,000 Bulgarian citizens had registered by the late afternoon hours of 5 March. As of 10 March 2021, approximately 70,000 people had selected vaccination slots for the period between 11 and 31 March. On 28 May 2021, the caretaker Health Minister approved the templates for the EU Digital COVID Certificate pertaining to a completed vaccine course, an incomplete vaccine course, and a completed mixed vaccine course. The people who have received vaccination certificates for immunizations administered up to 1 June will be able to obtain reissued versions in accordance with the EU requirements. In August 2021, Bogdan Kirilov, the executive director of the Bulgarian Drug Agency, claimed that there is no guarantee that the vaccines will remain free for all citizens in the future. In late September 2021, the information portal coronavirus.bg began publishing data regarding the vaccination status of the people testing positive, in need of hospitalization and those succumbing to the disease. Since 19 November 2021, the people who are to receive vaccines no longer have to fill out and sign an informed consent form. Since 20 December 2021, Bulgarian citizens as well as people with a permanent, long-term or of significant duration residency status in Bulgaria who have been vaccinated abroad are eligible to receive boosters. On 1 July 2022, the online system allowing prior booking of slots for COVID-19 vaccination temporarily ceased functioning.

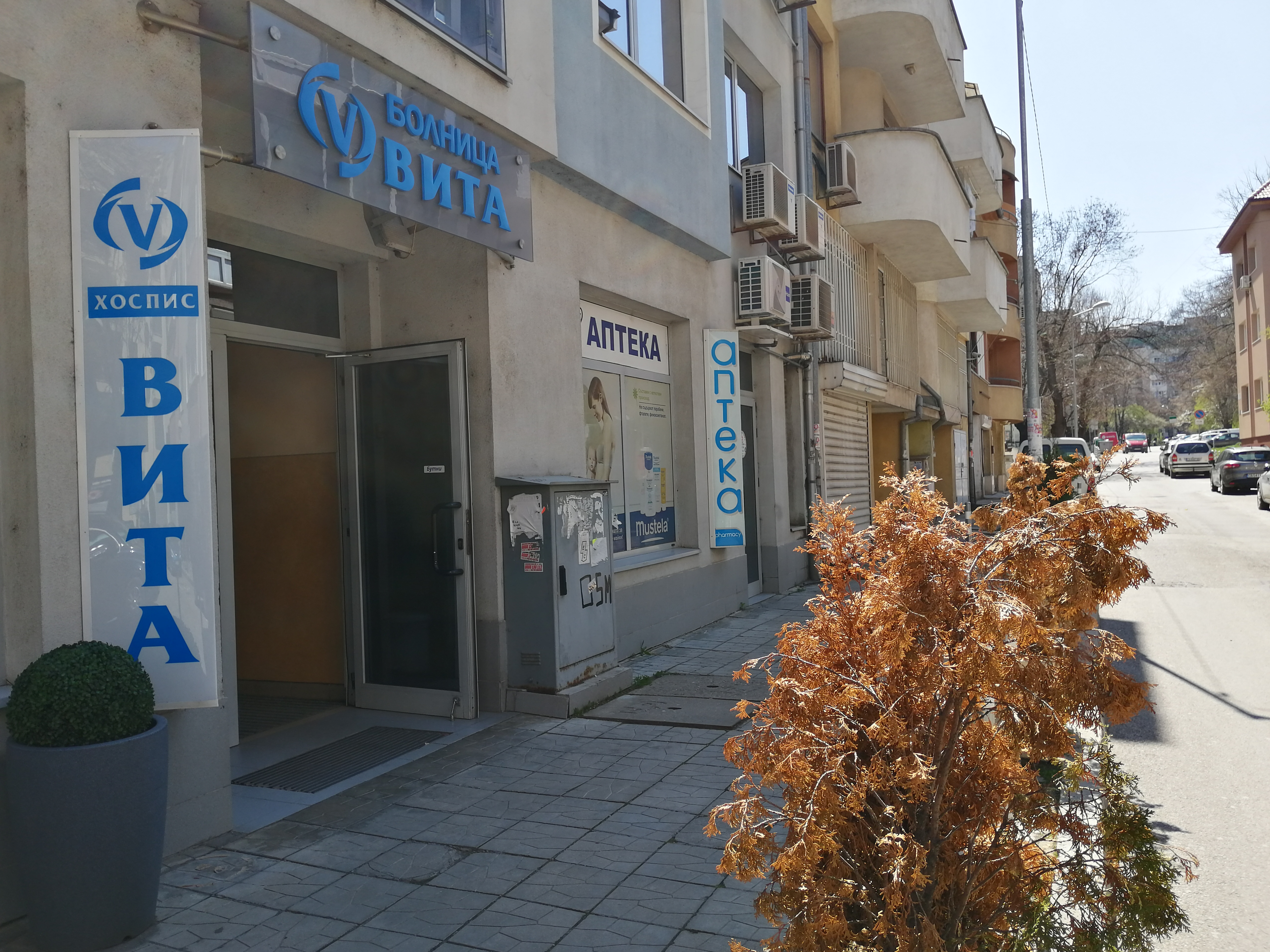
A clinic in Poduyane, Sofia where people can be tested for the virus and also receive COVID-19 vaccines.

== Legal aspects ==
According to Maria Sharkova, an attorney of medical law, and Todor Kapitanov, an expert in the field of employment law, as well as other legal practitioners in Bulgaria, employers currently cannot impose a requirement on their employees to be vaccinated against COVID-19.

Sharkova stated in September 2021 that the administering of a booster dose could be considered to be off-label prior to any official statement made by EMA and entail risks of legal repercussions for the medical practitioners who do so, especially in the case of unwelcome side effects, unless it was legally mandated by the Health Minister's signature. The Ministry of Health insisted that the green light given by the expert council on health matters in Bulgaria should be sufficient.

In August 2021, prior to the introduction of the vaccine passes on the national level, The Medical University in Plovdiv began requiring a vaccine certificate, a negative test or proof of recovery from an infection for the students who attend practical sessions. In a letter addressed to the media one of the students contested the constitutionality of this requirement. In the autumn of 2021, a number of other universities in the country that did not intend to make the full switch to remote teaching also followed suit with the same precondition for attendance.

Legal experts have warned that the muddled language employed in a lot of the regulations pertaining to the vaccination campaign may make it very difficult to hold the medical practitioners who provide fraudulent vaccine certificates to account.

In January 2022, it was reported that Bulgaria is being sued for "vaccination failure", with the Bulgarian Helsinki Committee and the Institute for European Politics "Open Society" (Bulgarian: Институт по европейски политики "Отворено общество") submitting complaints to the European Committee of Social Rights and the Sofia Municipal Court. This is due to the country failing to prioritize people with chronic conditions and the elderly between December 2020 and May 2021 in terms of providing them with access to vaccines as well as not doing enough to inform such groups of the benefits of vaccination. 36.9% of Bulgarians aged over 60 were fully vaccinated at the time. A lawsuit pertaining to improper vaccination procedures due to a medical practitioner administering an unauthorized vaccine to children was also filed by private citizens.

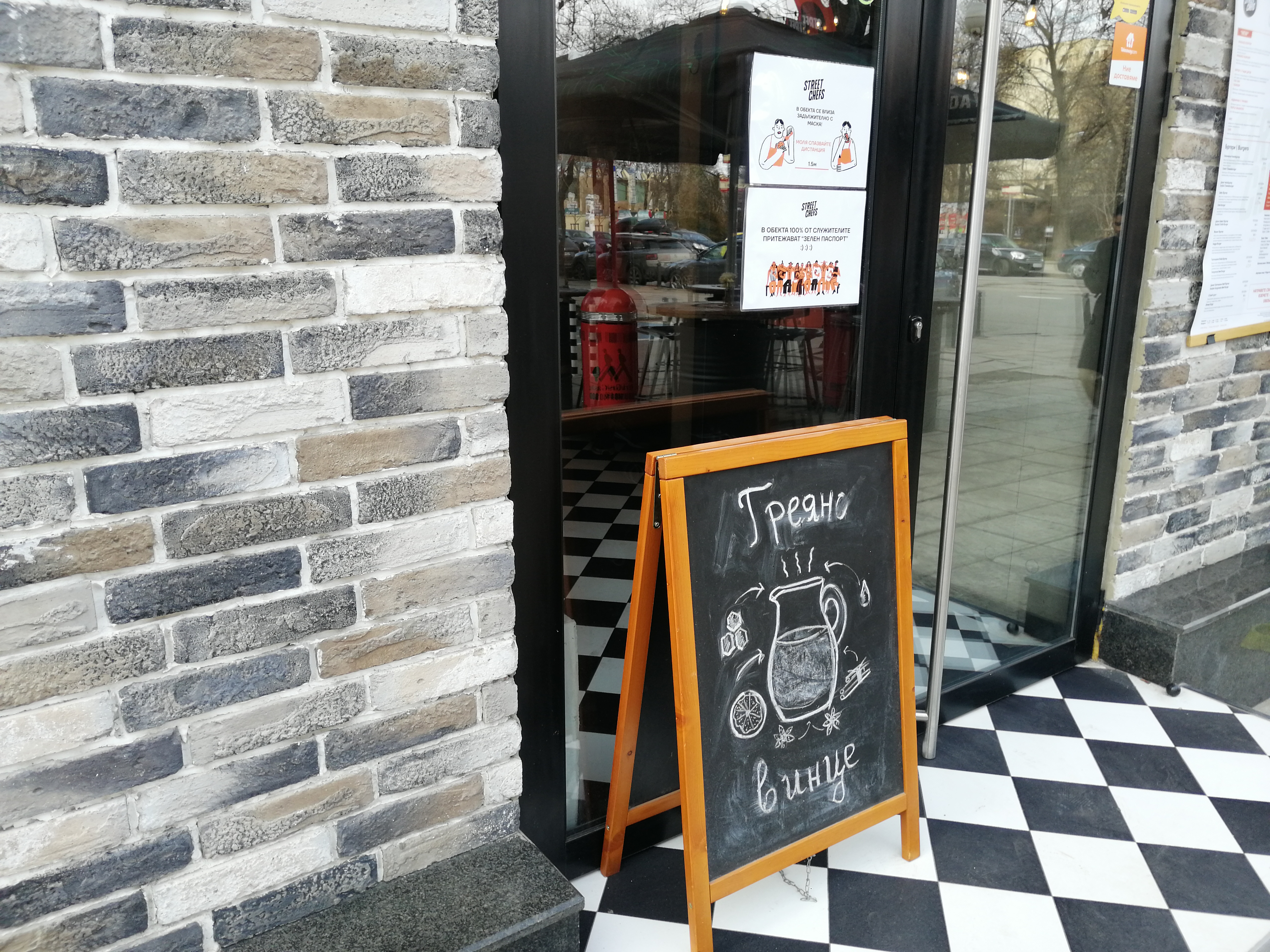
An eating establishment with a presumably fully vaccinated staff.

== Effects on the pandemic ==
=== Estimates regarding immunity within the population ===
The officially registered COVID-19 cases in Bulgaria are believed to underreport the actual number of infections by a factor of at least 2, mathematician Lachezar Tomov surmising that the underestimation is sixfold, with a significant amount of hidden COVID-19 afflictions consistently eluding detection, in part due to people buying COVID-19 test kits from pharmacies and not reporting to health authorities. In the autumn of 2020, mathematicians such as Nikolay Vitanov multiplied the officially registered cases by 8 while since 2021 they have been multiplying them by 4 in order to get a clearer picture regarding the real epidemiological situation. In the summer of 2022, mathematician Ognyan Kunchev estimated that the real number of cases may be potentially up to 10 times higher than the officially registered ones due to the low levels of testing and the transmissibility of Omicron.

An epidemiological study from June 2020 reached the conclusion that 2% of Bulgarians had developed antibodies against COVID-19. The Cibalab private laboratory analyzed 2665 samples collected throughout the country between 25 May and 11 June 2021, with 1158 from them (43%) showing a positive result for the presence of antibodies. This survey has been characterized as falling far short of standards for representativeness and as methodologically suspect, with the Health Ministry criticized by experts for publicizing the results.

Alpha Research sociologists speculated, based on the results of a survey for the period between 11 and 18 December 2020, that 670,000 Bulgarians may have had the virus and recovered from it. In February 2021, a Gallup survey conducted between the 4th and the 12th of that month drew the conclusion that 1.5 million Bulgarians may have had the virus. In an April 2021 Gallup survey, close to one third of adult Bulgarians claimed to have either recovered from the virus or been vaccinated with two doses.

Мathematician Nikolay Vitanov estimated in late January 2021 that some 20% of Bulgarians may have encountered the virus in some form. In March 2021, physician Emil Hristov, drawing on various sources, provided an even higher estimate of between 2 and 2.5 million while also expressing skepticism that the number of vaccinated will start to exceed those who have recovered from infection any time soon. Mathematician Lachezar Tomov claimed in March 2021 that any numbers in the vicinity of 2 million are most likely an overestimate, though he stated that they were reached six months later - by September 2021.

In late April 2021, Vitanov estimated a "shield" (recovered and vaccinated) of 33.6% Bulgarians against the virus. In September 2021, taking into account the likelihood of reinfections, Lachezar Tomov assessed the "shield" to be around 40%.

According to Nedyalko Kalachev, the head of the Cibalab laboratories, 12 024 out of 26 425 (45%) of the people who submitted samples for the month of November 2021 had IgG antibody levels above 150 BAU/ml (required for a green certificate unless the person has been vaccinated or has a negative test result), though he considers the truly protective threshold to be above 700 BAU/ml.

Bulgaria will receive methodology from the EU for assessing the situation in the country in terms of natural and vaccine-generated immunity to the virus.

=== Vaccine effectiveness ===
According to Health Inspector Angel Kunchev 93.8% of the new COVID-19 infections during the third week of August 2021 were among non-vaccinated people. Kunchev later announced that between 22 and 28 August 2021, 97% of COVID-19 fatal outcomes involved non-vaccinated Bulgarians. Data provided by the Ministry of Health for the period between 1 March and 14 September 2021 indicated that 99.33% of the COVID-19 related fatalities in the country were among people who had not been vaccinated. In the autumn of 2021, Ventsislav Mutafchiyski stated that over 90% of the COVID-19 patients in the Military Medical Academy were not vaccinated, with over 98% of the cases with a lethal outcome being of non-vaccinated people.

=== Herd immunity scenarios ===
==== Herd effect projections ====
According to experts, taking into account the situation in early 2021, 60% vaccinated people plus those who have had the disease and recovered from it may be sufficient for herd immunity to kick in. Then Health Minister Kostadin Angelov stated in February 2021 that at least 70% will need to be vaccinated in order to guarantee the return of normal life. In May 2021, virologist Radostina Aleksandrova, taking into account the different mutations and the delay in vaccinations, tentatively calculated the herd immunity threshold to be at 80% while in March mathematician Lachezar Tomov put the number at 85%, assuming the Alpha variant would become dominant in the country. In July 2021, molecular biologist Georgi Marinov stated that herd immunity could be achieved if 90% of the people are immunized, though he also characterized it as likely a temporary state of affairs due to the waning immunity from the vaccines. He thus advised the Bulgarians immunized in December 2020 and January 2021 to already consider a second vaccination cycle.

Asen Baltov, the director of Pirogov Hospital, cautioned in March 2021 that at least 3 million people will have to be vaccinated by August–September if the country is to avoid a fourth wave in the autumn of 2021, with caretaker Health Minister Stoycho Katsarov also acknowledging in June 2021 that Bulgaria is facing a real risk of such a scenario occurring in case of insufficient vaccination rate and due to remaining issues in the health system. Mathematician Lachezar Tomov stated in mid June 2021 that at least 30,000 new people will need to be vaccinated per day (until 15 September 2021) in order for the country to prevent this eventuality.

In late April 2021, physician Nikolay Branzalov, taking into account the ratio of vaccinated and recovered to the newly infected, predicted that unless there are major virus mutations, escaping the vaccines, there will not be a next COVID-19 wave in Bulgaria.

Ognyan Kunchev, a member of the Informatics and Mathematics Institute of BAS, estimated in March 2021 that the pandemic will peter out by the end of 2021 if 100,000-120,000 people are vaccinated per month, viewing it as likely that approximately 1 million Bulgarians have already had the virus. Allergist Bogdan Petrunov stated in March 2021 that vaccinating 2 million Bulgarians may be sufficient for attaining herd immunity while mathematician Lachezar Tomov has insisted that approximately 5 million vaccinated will be needed for collective immunity of the population.

In mid April 2021, Kostadin Angelov stated that in an optimistic scenario herd immunity could be attained by the end of June, with the more realistic estimate being the end of July and the most pessimistic one considered to be the end of August.

==== Dominant variants ====
The different COVID-19 variants and their interactions with natural and vaccine-induced immunity are likely to change initial calculations when it comes to the herd immunity thresholds.

In June 2021, the presence of the Beta and Delta variants was detected by the National Center for Infectious and Parasitic Diseases in the country. The latter established itself as the dominant variant (being found in over 50% of genomic sequencing samples) as early as mid July 2021, beginning to rapidly displace Alpha. Delta's contagiousness and the still low vaccination coverage caused some experts to speculate that another wave may occur in Bulgaria by late August, which eventually materialized as a scenario at that time.

In September 2021, mathematician Lachezar Tomov stated that the wave driven by the Alpha variant that had affected Bulgaria during the spring could in part compensate for the very low level of vaccination coverage of the population, though he still expected a major rise in cases due to the beginning of the school year and the aggressiveness of the Delta variant, also expressing serious concern due to the lax pandemic control measures.

In late November 2021, mathematician Antony Rangachev stated that the introduction of the green certificates and the switch to online education for some of the students had been the major factors contributing to the turning of the tide during the fourth wave of the pandemic, though he expressed the concern that COVID-19 cases in the country could remain at a high plateau.

On 22 December 2021, Nedyalko Kalachev, the owner of the Cibalab laboratories, revealed that Omicron variant had been found in six virus samples. Iva Hristova, head of the Center for Infectious and Parasitic Diseases, stated that the presence of Omicron will need to be confirmed through genomic sequencing, for which the private laboratories lack the technology, with precise findings expected to be available after the new year. In an interview on 27 December 2021, mathematician Nikolay Vitanov estimated that Omicron is already in Bulgaria, believing that cases with this variant will start to rise by mid January 2022, with a fifth virus wave occurring in February 2022 as a result of Omicron's very high transmissibility and the still low vaccination coverage of the population. On 2 January 2022, the health authorities confirmed the first 12 cases of the Omicron variant. 7 of the infected had not been vaccinated, 5 had been fully vaccinated and none had received a booster dose. By the second half of January 2022, Omicron had displaced Delta in terms of dominance in Bulgaria. Lachezar Tomov cautioned in February 2022 that Bulgaria had so far failed to reverse any negative trends with regard to the major surges of the virus by relying mainly on herd immunity and without the imposition of new measures.

=== R0 number ===
The R0 number for the virus is believed to be able to reach values as high as 5 or 6 if the spread is uncontrolled, rising to 7 and 9 in the case of the Delta variant, with a potential reproduction factor of 15 with regard to Omicron. A further caveat is that in the case of COVID-19, it may not be the best measure for the state of the epidemiological situation due to the importance of superspreaders.

In Bulgaria the RO was estimated to be at 1.9 (with 10 people infecting 19 others) towards the end of October 2020, between 1.2 and 1.3 in early March 2021 and around 1.1 on 22 March 2021 (the first day of the third lockdown). On 13 May 2021, mathematician Nikolay Vitanov declared that the third wave in Bulgaria is ending, emphasizing the importance of the vaccinations and appraising the basic reproduction number to be at the record low 0.595. Approximately one month later, on 11 June, it stood at 0.716.

The effective reproduction number reached a value of 1.7 during the first weeks of the pandemic and hovered at slightly above 1 in May 2020. It is believed to have been constantly on the rise since 14 January 2021, exceeding 1 by early February 2021. It was below 1 for the month of May 2021, being calculated to be 0.81 around 6 May 2021 and 0.80 around 6 June 2021. In mid July 2021, experts warned that the number is once again around 1, which was also ultimately assessed to be the beginning of a fourth wave, and it reached a value of 1.5 in early August. It continued to consistently exceed 1 during the next two months, being assessed to be at 1.3 around 22 October, though it dropped to below 1 during November before starting to once again hover around that number towards the end of that month. The R0 number remained at around or just below 1 during December before rising sharply and reaching 1.7 in January 2022. It subsequently fell to slightly above 1 and was assessed as stable at 0.99 towards the end of the month. It was estimated to be below to just below 1 during the whole of February 2022 and March 2022.

== Other medical interventions ==
The COVID-19 vaccines remain the most reliable means of protection against infection, severe disease, lethal outcomes, and long-term effects of the disease. The presence of immunocompromised people within the population that may not derive the full benefits from vaccination and especially Bulgaria's rather low vaccination coverage has nonetheless resulted in a continued strong focus on the potential cures for COVID-19 long after the beginning of the immunization campaign, with the discovery of a highly effective and accessible medication gauged to be one of the ways to truly end the pandemic.

In terms of the treatment and management of the disease, Bulgaria has used, amongst other medications and depending on the severity of the symptoms, remdesivir, which first became available in June 2020, with the country having bought over 180,000 flasks from it by November 2021, and dexamethasone. Ivermectin, which the Bulgarian Executive Agency for Medicines approved on 15 January 2021 for the treatment of gastrointestinal strongyloidiasis, has been prescribed off-label by some physicians, even though its use, unless it is within the scope of well-designed clinical trials, runs contrary to the advice of EMA and the WHO, in part due to the potential for serious side effects. Colchicine has also been given to patients since April 2020 and shown promise, though its effectiveness and the exact dosage to be administered is still under evaluation.

In October 2021, the country ordered 3000 doses of monoclonal antibodies, which arrived in November 2021 and can be administered in hospital settings. Bulgaria also signed a contract for the delivery of 20,000 doses of molnupiravir as well as unspecified quantities of paxlovid, successful clinical trials for which were held at the St. Pantaleymon Hospital in Plovdiv in December 2021. The Ministry of Health has signed a contract for the procurement of kineret as well.

The quality of treatment and the protocols followed have been criticized by a number of physicians and scientists on a multitude of grounds, especially due to the lack of a unified approach among physicians in managing COVID-19 symptoms and practices such as the overreliance on antibiotics in the early stages of the disease, with the latter also noted as a concern by the WHO. The staffing-to-patient ratio for serious COVID-19 cases has also been regarded as falling far short of the international standards.

== Controversies and criticism ==
=== Domestic critiques of the authorities' policies ===
The government has come under scrutiny for the delay in ordering a number of vaccines, the lack of sufficient transparency regarding the quantities, the call to give up on doses of the two RNA vaccines, for which Bulgaria had been eligible, during the initial pre-orders as well as the reasons behind its decision to center its vaccination campaign on Oxford-AstraZeneca in particular. In the case of the Oxford vaccine, due to the cheaper cost of AstraZeneca relative to the RNA vaccines and the former's easier storage requirements, the authorities have mainly been criticized for allowing financial considerations to take precedence over health-related ones. Concerns have also been raised due to the government not outlining a plan for creating special vaccination centers and training additional personnel capable of administering vaccine shots, which has contributed to a slow pace of the vaccinations. The lack of expediency with the vaccinations has been assessed as entailing significant risks for the country being able to meet its economic growth targets for 2021 and has been deemed likely (in combination with the relaxing of many pandemic control measures during the month of April 2021) to considerably lessen the country's appeal as a summer destination for tourists due to a continuing high rate of infections. As of late May 2021, only 45% of the vaccine doses delivered to Bulgaria had been administered, compared to an average for the EU of 85%. In September 2021, Chief Health Inspector Angel Kunchev reiterated that if the vaccination coverage remains at a low level, Bulgaria will hardly see tourists visiting during 2022.

Pulmonologist Kosta Kostov has been very critical of the way in which the vaccination campaign has been organized and implemented, regarding it as not premised on empathy, being incredulous that people over 65 and clinically vulnerable individuals are in phase 4 rather than being the top priority targets and maintaining that people who have recovered from the disease should not be vaccinated as long as there is an insufficient quantity of vaccines. Similarly, Dimitrina Petkova, an expert on equality in health care, has characterized the vaccination plan as unfair to the elderly due to attaching a greater value on reducing the spread by vaccinating economically active young people rather than by focusing on especially vulnerable groups in order to save the most lives, a sentiment echoed by caretaker Health Minister Stoycho Katsarov who considered its faulty approach in terms of prioritization and the issues with vaccine procurement to have resulted in the loss of 10 000 lives.

The decision taken by the government on 19 February 2021 to set in motion the mass vaccination process has been criticized for inviting chaos, with general practitioners complaining of a lack of vaccines provided to them for their registered patients who belong mainly to high-risk groups, with most of the doses allocated to the hospitals for random vaccinations, not allowing for thorough medical check-ups of the people prior to the administering of vaccines. Concerns have also been raised that the citizens who had already received one shot may not be able to get their second injection as scheduled. The shift in the modus operandi has been contested for its dubious legal basis due to being in apparent contradiction with the authorities' own phased approach to the vaccinations, entailing the prioritization of vulnerable groups such as the elderly, and has been characterized as a desperate attempt to boost the vaccination statistics. As of 1 April 2021, only 9% of the elderly and chronically ill had been vaccinated. As of 18 May 2021, less than 20% of the people considered especially vulnerable had received at least one dose of vaccine. By 24 June 2021, one third of care home residents had been administered at least one shot of vaccine. The issue has resulted in media crossfires between Kostadin Angelov and his caretaker government successor, Stoycho Katsarov.

The need for general practitioners to queue for vaccines for their patients in front of the regional health inspectorates has invited tension and been described as humiliating as well as an example of an inefficient time management. In response to this issue, the caretaker government decided in May 2021 to set up logistical points for each municipality where regional health inspectorates are to deliver flasks with vaccines, taking into account the quantities requested by the general practitioners.

Former Health Minister Kostadin Angelov has expressed criticism of those medical practitioners who have encouraged their patients not to get themselves vaccinated.

In March 2021, some medical experts in Bulgaria characterized the temporary suspension of the vaccinations with Oxford Astra-Zeneca as an overreaction and potentially dangerous in terms of stoking fears among the already vaccinated while in September 2021 caretaker Health Minister Stoycho Katsarov blamed Boyko Borisov's intervention at the time for reducing people's trust in this vaccine.

The Expert Council on Obstetrics and Gynecology has courted controversy by strongly recommending against pregnant women receiving vaccines, contrary to the existing scientific evidence.

A number of media sources have taken issue with the government's manner of reporting the official figures regarding the number of individuals who have been vaccinated, believing that it invites confusion.

Concerns have been expressed regarding the lack of a targeted campaign to vaccinate the children aged 12 and over.

The issuing of fake vaccine certificates by people working within the medical field has been noted as a concern, with the media raising the alarm regarding such instances and 14 such signals received by the office of the Chief Prosecutor as of early October 2021.

The manner in which the "green certificates" were introduced by the authorities in October 2021 has been criticized by experts due to being a delayed measure, the lack of a sufficient pre-warning, especially given the low rate of vaccination in Bulgaria, for creating panic among citizens, also hampering the work of medical professionals, for potentially encouraging the issuing of fake documents, the inherent health risks due to people with far from completed vaccination courses being able to obtain them, coupled with the scientifically suspect issuing of such documents based solely on antibody levels and due to not being a sufficiently strict measure, serving as an inadequate substitute for a lockdown.

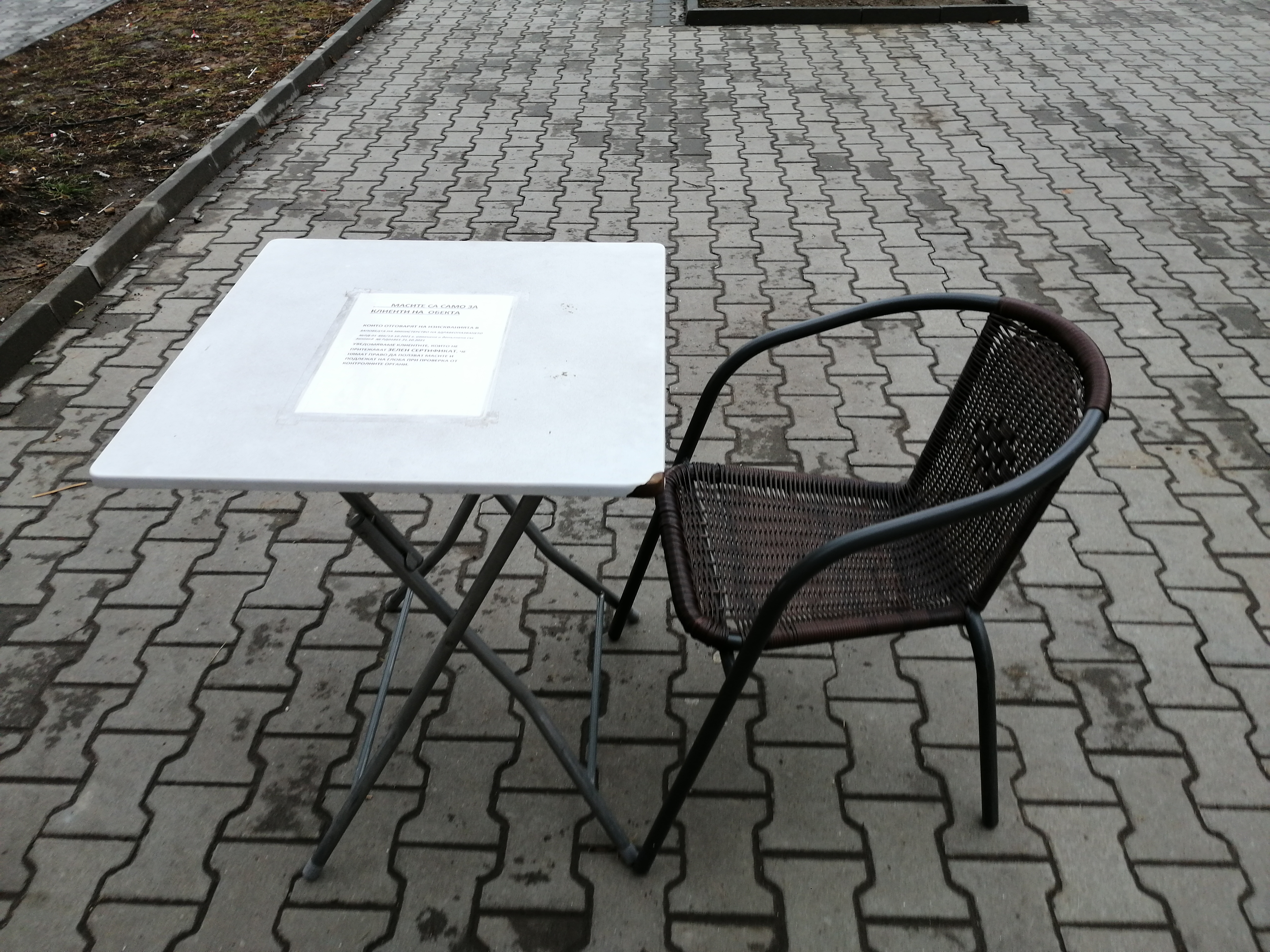
An outdoor table at a café in Krasno selo requiring a green certificate.

=== Specific incidents ===
Some of the vaccines that arrived Sofia on 26 December were subsequently transported to Plovdiv by using a Leki food industry minibus, and were then stored in a ZiL refrigerator on reaching their destination, which resulted in criticism and mockery on social media, but the Health Ministry cited examples of such reliance on the services of private companies not being an unusual practice in Western countries and maintained that all the proper guidelines had been observed.

On 9 January 2021, the Ministry of Health revealed that it was conducting an urgent investigation after receiving information that councillors in Sandanski Municipality had already received vaccines despite not being part of the groups prioritized during the first phase, as stipulated by the vaccination plan. The director of the hospital in Sandanski, Iliya Tonev, subsequently claimed that a number of the people who were to have priority in terms of vaccinations had ultimately decided against it, so appointments were set up with the councillors (who were among the volunteers in popularizing the Pfizer-BioNTech vaccine) at a short notice in order for the doses not to go to waste. However, after the review of the facts, the Minister of Health was adamant that the protocols had not been adhered to in vaccinating 24 of the people, as there had been sufficient time for a proper redistribution of the vaccines, claiming that if he had the authority, he would have released the hospital director from his duties.

In February 2021, chief national health inspector Angel Kunchev revealed that people holding anti-vaccination views had in a number of instances deliberately signed up for receiving their injections and then failed to show up in the hopes of sabotaging the vaccination process. The online registration system for vaccinations has been subjected to hacker attacks.

In late February 2021, a young couple from Pleven was refused vaccination because of not having proper health insurance. The Health Minister ordered that the case be looked into, confirming that each Bulgarian citizen is eligible for vaccination regardless of his or her health insurance status. Yordan Georgiev, the director of the St. Pantaleymon hospital where the situation had transpired, was criticized for not being familiar with the Health Ministry's policies, with journalists also drawing attention to the multitude of instances of British citizens without health insurance having received vaccinations in Bulgaria. The man and the woman were subsequently invited by other hospitals in the city to be administered their doses.

In March 2021, Angelov revealed that some people had been signing up to participate as electoral commission members (without intending to follow through with their commitments) just so that they could get themselves vaccinated.

In May 2021, police had to be called after Turkish citizens, some of whom were also with Spanish passports, who had travelled across the border to make use of Bulgaria's "green corridors" attempted to receive a jab at a mobile vaccination point near the Regional Health Inspectorate of Bourgas. According to Bulgarian legal regulations, only foreigners permanently residing in Bulgaria or those meeting certain criteria, such as foreign students enrolled at Bulgarian universities or members of diplomatic missions, as well as those with dual citizenship are eligible to be vaccinated in the country.

In September 2021, a group of vaccine sceptics self-styled as "Committee of Salvation" who demanded a document confirming that the vaccines are authorized to be administered in Bulgaria disrupted the proceedings at a mobile vaccination point at the entrance to the Sea Garden in Varna, eventually causing it to discontinue its work. The incident was strongly condemned by the Health Minister.

Since late September 2021 banners proclaiming that COVID-19 is a hoax and opposing all the vaccines have been placed prominently near the Monument to the Tsar Liberator and the Old House of the National Parliament by members of the "People's Party the Truth and Only the Truth" (Bulgarian: "Народна партия Истината и само истината"), associated with Ventsislav Angelov, a candidate for president. In early October Traycho Traychov, mayor of Sredets district that covers the area, insisted that the signs be removed, but the party organizers have been able to secure permission from the municipality regarding the continued display of the banners. The same signs had been ordered to be taken off in Rousse, Angelov's hometown, by the mayor of the city, Pencho Milkov, with some sources criticizing his Sofia counterpart Yordanka Fandakova for not following the same course of action.

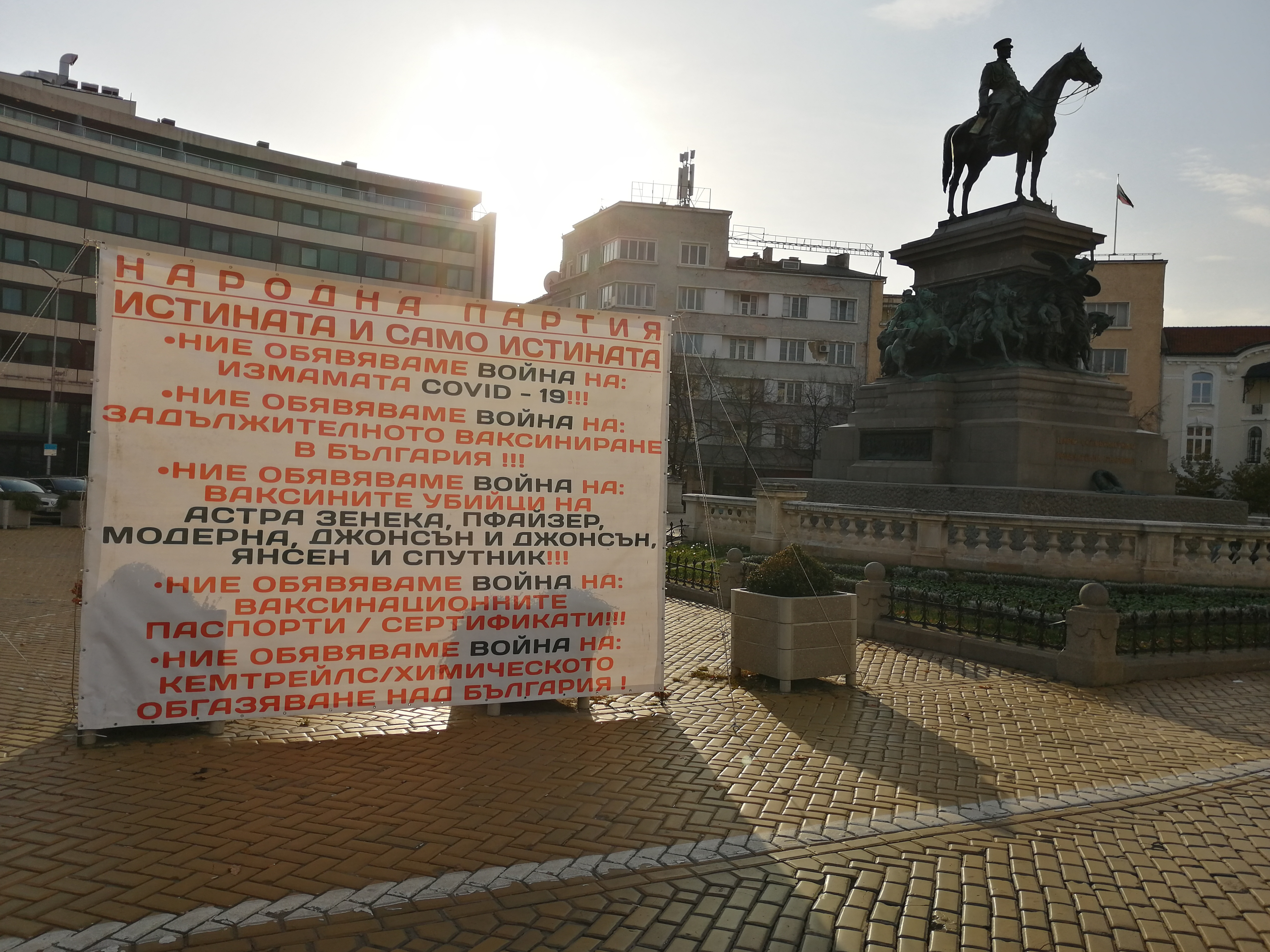
One of the controversial banners of the "People's Party the Truth and Only the Truth".

In October 2021, the police dismantled a criminal network operating across the whole country and involved in the issuing of fraudulent COVID-19 vaccine certificates, with four suspects being detained in Veliko Tarnovo. It was determined that at least five such documents had been provided, with two of the recipients no longer residing in the country. People employed in a hospital in Kyustendil and a paramedic from Yablanitsa are also believed to be part of the scam. The issue has received attention in neighbouring Greece, as some Greek citizens have obtained such certificates, with the headquarters of a number of criminal groups involved in the practice believed to be in the city of Sandanski.

On 20 October 2021, caretaker Minister of Education Nikolay Denkov was accosted by a number of sympathizers of the Vazrazhdane party who were protesting against the green certificates and other policies such as the wearing of face masks by schoolchildren. One of the involved attempted to get physical with the educator, but the presence of police officers prevented an escalation of the situation.

On 23 October 2021, Kostadin Kostadinov, leader of Vazrazhdane, posted a video on his Facebook profile, alleging that expired vaccines were being administered to Bulgarians. The Ministry of Health refuted this, maintaining that there have been no instances of vaccines being used past their expiry date and that EMA had changed the shelf life of the Pfizer vaccine from 6 to 9 months in accordance with the standard procedure. On 24 October 2021, Boyko Borisov made the same allegation, as a result of which the Health Minister alerted the Prosecutor's Office in Sofia due to what he regarded as the spreading of fake news.

In November 2021, a fraud scheme for COVID-19 vaccine passes in Sofia, involving Velichko Georgiev, a politician from the Patriotic Front coalition, was unravelled after a Nova TV investigation. The immunity of Georgiev, who was a candidate to be a deputy in the National Parliament, was waived and he was expelled from the NFSB. During the same month, police broke up another fake COVID-19 vaccine certificate network, operating in Asenovgrad and Rakovski, involved in the issuing of at least 250 such documents, arresting four people.

In November 2021, chief health inspector Angel Kunchev who had been vaccinated with two doses tested positive for COVID-19. Fake news that he had been hospitalized in serious condition and lost the battle against the disease were subsequently spread on the Internet.

On 31 December 2021, a few hours before New Year's Eve, a 53-year old former army serviceman was detained by the police at the Alexander of Battenberg Square in Sofia after expressing anti-vaccination views and threatening to detonate a grenade.

In January 2022, controversial conspiracy theorist Ventsislav Angelov aggressively confronted and got into a serious physical altercation with a medical practitioner who had administered a Janssen vaccine, which was alleged to have contributed to a fatal outcome in the case of the recipient, and was subsequently arrested by the police.

On 21 January 2022, it was reported that the chief prosecutor's office was in the process of investigating infectiologist Atanas Mangarov due to his allegations (refuted by the Ministry of Health) that more than 500 fatalities had occurred as a direct result of the administration of vaccines. In October 2022, the Sofia District Prosecutor's Office decreed that Mangarov's statements did not equate to inciting panic and he could not be held legally liable for them.

In February 2022, police broke up a network at a medical center in Sofia involved in the issuing of more than 3000 fraudulent green certificates.

=== Criticism from abroad ===
In December 2020, Bulgaria stated that it will take the initiative in securing vaccines for North Macedonia and other states from the Western Balkans, but as of mid February 2021, with the country struggling to obtain enough vaccines for its own citizens, this had not materialized, generating critical headlines in the Macedonian and Bulgarian media. On 29 May 2021, it was confirmed that Bulgaria would donate 50,000 of its vaccine doses to North Macedonia as a "friendly gesture".

In November 2021, the European Commissioner for Internal Market Thierry Breton visited Bulgaria to meet with caretaker Prime Minister Stefan Yanev, expressing full support for Bulgaria's fight against COVID-19 and offering help while also emphasizing that the low vaccination coverage in the country could potentially result in the creation of an additional variant of the virus, putting other EU citizens at risk. European Commissioner for Health and Food Safety Stella Kyriakides voiced similar concerns in December 2021.

A banner of The Representative Office of the European Commission in Sofia intended to popularize the vaccination campaign in Bulgaria, on which a young couple is depicted.

Another poster advertising the vaccination campaign, on which a man and his granddaughter are shown.

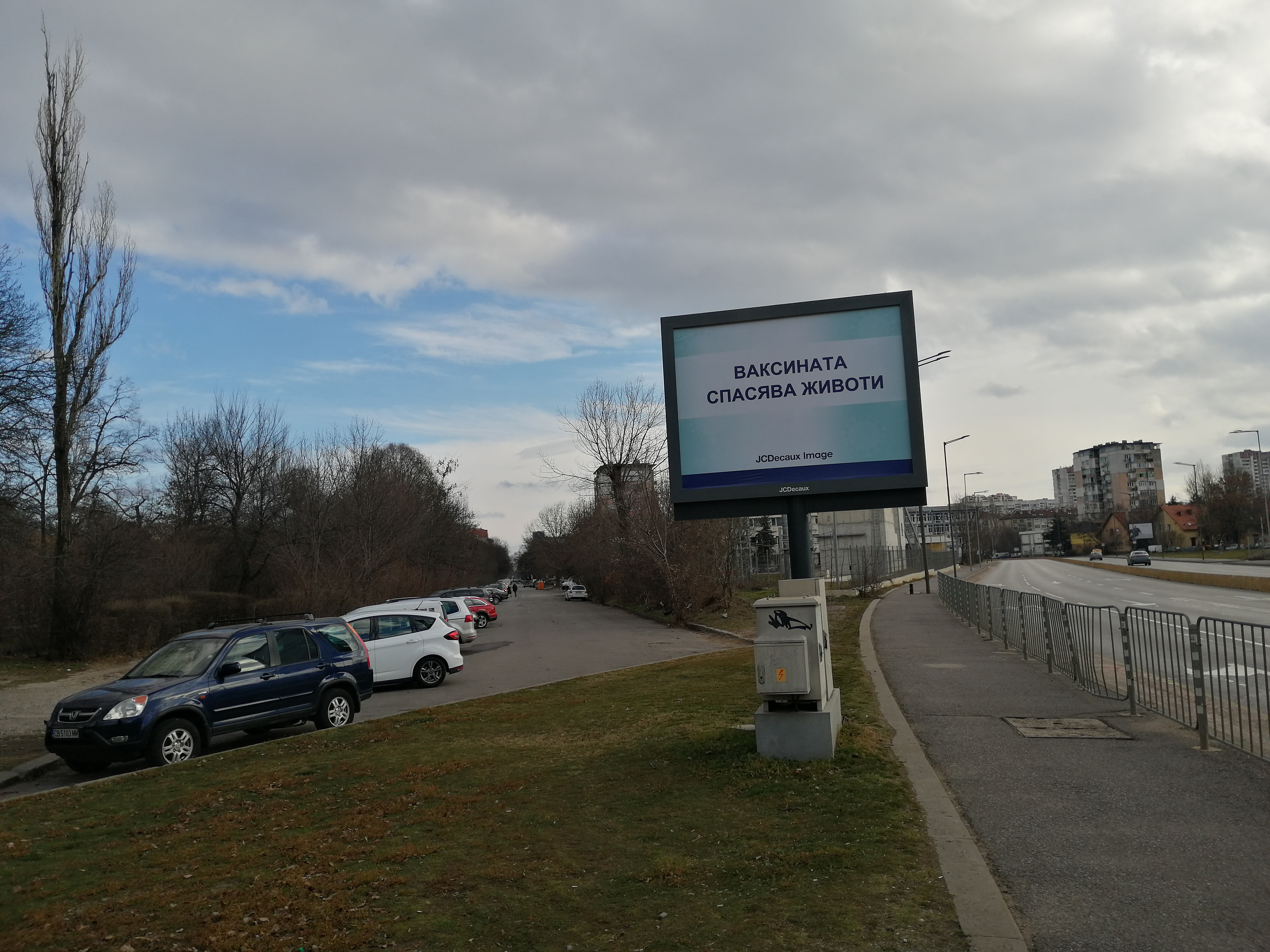
A billboard in the Ilinden district with the message that the vaccine saves lives.

== Attitudes of the general public ==
=== Assessment of government response to the pandemic ===
According to an April 2020 Gallup survey, over 75% of the citizens expressed support for the lockdown-related pandemic control measures taken by the government and the members of the National Operational Headquarters for the fight against the coronavirus in Bulgaria, but the subsequent loosening of restrictions and the exponential rise in cases in October and November caused public support for the authorities' strategy to plummet to slightly over 30%. In an Alpha Research survey conducted between 8 and 15 September 2021 24.2% of Bulgarians expressed approval of the caretaker government's performance in managing the pandemic and the vaccination campaign while 42% had a negative view. In а Маrch 2022 Alpha Research survey 42.2% of Bulgarians rated the Petkov government's policies in relation to healthcare and the pandemic as successful while 55.6% regarded them as unsuccessful.

=== Views on the vaccinations ===
While Bulgaria has historically been characterized by receptive attitudes to vaccines, with the country having a long tradition of compulsory immunizations against certain diseases and a high national vaccination coverage for children, the lack of trust in the government and the health providers was from the outset believed likely to provide additional fuel for vaccine hesitancy attitudes, which have been regarded as pervasive in contemporary Bulgarian society. According to a survey conducted by the WHO in Bulgaria and published in November 2020, 37% of respondents indicated that they will not have themselves vaccinated while one January 2021 Gallup poll saw 46% of interviewees declaring that they will not take a COVID-19 vaccine. Prior to the pandemic, less than 4% of Bulgarian adults opted for the flu vaccine. Nonetheless, in the first three months since the vaccinations began Bulgaria was roughly in line with the EU average, especially with other Eastern European countries, when it came to the people's dispositions towards the vaccines.

An Exacta Research Group survey covering the period between 12 and 20 March 2021 revealed that the share of Bulgarians categorically ruling out vaccination against COVID-19 had once again fallen to below 40%. However, in May 2021 the country still occupied the top spot among EU countries with regard to vaccine skepticism, according to data from Eurofound. In September 2021, in another Gallup survey, 45% of the respondents declared that they had not been vaccinated and do not intend to do so. А nation-wide opinion sampling of 1151 adult Bulgarian citizens conducted by the Bulgarian Academy of Sciences, the University of National and World Economy, Bulgarian Sociological Association and the Union of Economists of Bulgaria in mid 2021 showed that while 60% of respondents supported a full lockdown if necessary, a plurality (44.3 vs. 22.4%) preferred a natural infection to a vaccine if having to choose between the two, with 27.5 neutral regarding these options.

There have been regional differences regarding the interest in the vaccinations and people residing in smaller cities and villages have been less enthusiastic about the "green corridors". Education correlates positively with a desire for vaccination, with university educated people, those residing in the capital and those aged over 40 being the most willing while people aged 18 to 40, less educated cohorts and those based outside Sofia are more likely to display reservations, according to an Exacta poll. Males also showed a somewhat greater vaccine hesitancy than females in this survey. Skepticism regarding vaccines is a major issue when it comes to the Romani people, though the enthusiasm among the members of this group has increased, with the one-dose Janssen vaccine being the most popular.

An April 2021 Gallup survey revealed that 50% of Bulgarians expressed qualified support for COVID-19 vaccine passports while 43% were opposed. A Darik Radio poll of over 1300 Bulgarians conducted shortly after the October 2021 introduction of the green certificate saw 32.6% of the respondents in favor of the pandemic control measures and approving of the vaccine pass, 28% accepting of the non-pharmaceutical interventions, but regarding the green pass in particular to be discriminatory, 32.16% totally opposed to it and 7% preferring a full lockdown. According to sociologist Dimitar Ganev from "Trend", as of January 2022, the majority of the country's citizens remained negatively disposed towards the green pass requirement.

In a dataset of 33 European countries compiled in January 2023, Bulgaria occupied the last spot, with 67.91 vaccine doses per 100 population. In comparison, table leader Portugal had administered 272.78 doses per 100 people.

=== Vaccine preferences ===
According to a March 2021 survey, 65.8% of the general practitioners' patients preferred one of the two RNA vaccines, 28.9% expressed no preference while 5.3% gave the nod to Oxford-AstraZeneca, with the Pfizer-BioNTech vaccine being the most in demand as part of the "green corridors". Since its approval, Janssen has gradually started to overtake Moderna in terms of popularity, presumably due to it being one-shot, with 151 391 out of 647 382 administered doses between 12 May and 7 September being with this vaccine. It was the only one out of the four vaccines that was used more frequently in September 2021 compared to June 2021.

=== Explanations for the vaccine hesitancy ===
The possibly false belief among many Bulgarians that they have already had the virus and recovered from it has also been identified as a further contributing factor to the vaccine skepticism, being the most selected option in a Gallup poll from March 2022. Concerns about the vaccine safety and the side effects remain important reasons.

In a prevailing climate of "informational anarchy", as characterized by social anthropologist Haralan Alexandrov, the media in Bulgaria have been blamed for giving undue weight to vaccine skeptics, including those within the medical community, in their coverage of COVID-19, thus mainstreaming a variety of fringe or pseudoscientific views, as well as refraining from showing the reality on the ground inside the COVID-19 hospital wards.

In sociologist Aleksandar Marinov's view, the discordant tone between the public institutions in the country is believed to have also negatively affected trust in the vaccines while in journalist Yassen Boyadzhiev's opinion politicians such as Kiril Petkov who are pro-vaccination have been overly accommodating of ill-intentioned vaccine skeptics and have made the mistake to include them in discussion groups on pandemic control measures.

The business sector has also been criticized for not being actively engaged in agitating for vaccinations.

The country as a whole, which faced high levels of intra-societal polarization during 2020 and 2021, has been identified as especially susceptible to disinformation warfare due to a lack of a developed infrastructure to guard against such tactics. Such propaganda campaigns are sometimes driven from abroad, with some sources blaming the Chinese and Russian influence in that regard, seeing the anti-vaccine rhetoric as part of an orchestrated campaign against the country's future in the EU. According to Kalin Yanakiev, a lecturer in philosophy from Sofia University, strong anti-vaccine attitudes in Bulgaria tend to go hand in hand with anti-Western views, Russophilia, nationalism and identification with the Orthodox faith.

=== Countering vaccine hesitancy ===
Due to the vaccine trepidations and the proliferation of conspiracy theories in Bulgaria pertaining to the nature of the virus itself, an information and explanation campaign pertaining to the vaccines and directed at the general public, including educated groups such as teachers, and the physicians themselves, a low percentage of whom have recommended vaccination to their patients, with 20.8% of medical personnel immunized as of 27 June 2021, has been identified by some journalists as the real challenge with regard to vaccinating a sufficient number of people, so that herd immunity could be reached.

Public vaccinations of politicians have also been regarded as potentially useful in allaying people's fears of the COVID-19 vaccines.

The Representative Office of the European Commission in Sofia has pledged cooperation with the Ministry of Health in popularizing the vaccination campaign. In June 2021, European Commissioner for Health and Food Safety Stella Kyriakides visited Bulgaria and discussed the country's vaccination program as well as suitable measures to broaden the appeal of the vaccines. with the WHO also offering financial support. Hotels and restaurants in the Albena resort achieved a high degree of vaccination coverage as a result of the provision of financial incentives by the management.

In July 2021, as part of its strategy for encouraging vaccinations, the Ministry of Education took the decision to offer two additional days of paid leave to educators who are vaccinated while the schools where at least 70% of staff members are vaccinated will receive a certificate for contribution to public health.

Food vouchers have been offered to vaccinated people making purchases in supermarkets, though this strategy has not made a significant difference in encouraging vaccine uptake.

The offering of financial bonuses is believed likely to yield dividends in increasing the vaccination drive among the generally less affluent Romanis.

In September 2021, caretaker Minister of Tourism Stella Baltova announced that the Health Ministry will organize draws for people who are vaccinated. All Bulgarian citizens over the age of 12 who were vaccinated between 30 September and 31 October 2021 were able to enter a draw, organized by the Ministry of Health, for one of 102 smartphones, with the youngest participant aged 12 and the oldest 92.

In November 2021, economist Georgi Angelov suggested that each vaccinated retiree receive 1000 leva as a bonus.

Some public figures such as Health Inspector Angel Kunchev have urged that vaccinations be made mandatory for medical personnel and social workers in frequent contact with elderly people while former head of Pirogov Hospital Asen Baltov has expressed the opinion that in addition to the latter two categories, teachers, police officers and army personnel should be required to complete a vaccination course. Former caretaker Health Minister Stoycho Katsarov has also been sympathetic to the idea of people with certain occupations being subject to obligatory vaccinations. While strongly encouraging all Bulgarians to take a COVID-19 vaccine, in January 2022 Prime Minister Kiril Petkov ruled out the option of his government introducing mandatory vaccination.

In December 2021, the National Council of the Religious Communities in Bulgaria began working together with the Ministry of Health with the purpose of raising awareness regarding the benefits of vaccination.

On 23 December 2021, newly elected Prime Minister Kiril Petkov announced that each person over the age of 65 years who completes the vaccination course or has already received a booster dose will have 75 leva added to the next pension he/she is to receive. This initiative was set to run between 1 February and 30 June 2022 and it was subsequently confirmed that it would include retirees below the age of 65 as well.

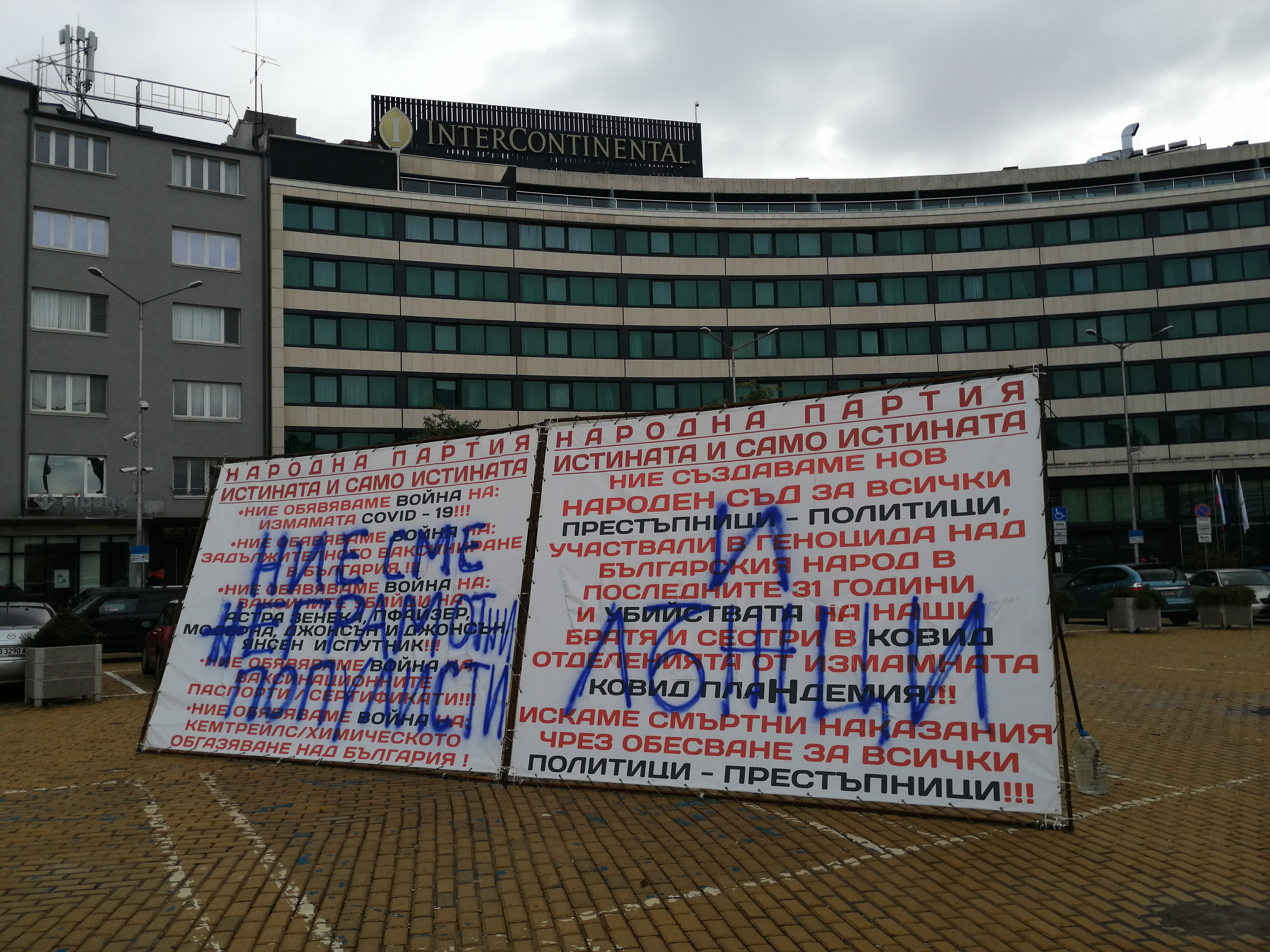
The controversial banners near the Old House of the National Parliament and the Monument to the Tsar Liberator, opposing all COVID-19 vaccines. The text in large blue letters expresses the opposite sentiment, reading "We [the authors] are illiterate populists and liars."

=== Political aspects and protests ===
Many politicians have been reluctant to broach the subject of vaccines and while a number of notable political figures eventually decided to be publicly vaccinated, they did not do so at the start of the vaccination campaign, but much later than many of their European counterparts. According to analysis posted by journalist Nikolay Lavchiev, only two parties - GERB and DPS - could be credibly described as explicitly pro-vaccination in terms of actively encouraging their sympathizers to get a vaccine. Parties on the far right, such as Vazrazhdane, have expressed strong reservations regarding the vaccinations, even though a number of the party's deputies in the National Parliament have been administered COVID-19 vaccines. The big tent ITN has also been accused by some sources of dabbling in anti-vaccine rhetoric.

The 47th National Assembly began its sessions without a green certificate requirement for the deputies, but on his election as new Prime Minister in December 2021 Kiril Petkov introduced such a measure for the Council of Ministers, which entered into force in February 2022.

On 7 January 2022, the deputies took the decision that access to the National Parliament will be conditional upon the possession of a green certificate, starting from 24 January. The members of ITN and Vazrazhdane did not participate in the vote. Due to the lack of a specified punitive mechanism for non-compliance with this requirement, there has been no enforcement by the National Security Service, with a number of deputies continuing to attend sessions without such a document.

A small protest against the vaccinations took place on 17 March 2021, in front of the Ministry of Health, while a similar demonstration occurred on 29 May 2021, in front of a vaccination began at Yuzhen Park. Small-scale protests against mandatory vaccinations and pandemic control measures continued to occur in August and September. Such protests increased in intensity after green certificates were mandated for indoor public places in October 2021. On 12 January 2022, Vazrazhdane held a large demonstration against the green certificates that took place in the vicinity of the National Parliament, during which sympathizers of the party attempted to break through the police lines and enter the building. On 23 February 2022, the party organized a similar protest while also expressing approval that on 21 February the government had vowed to gradually phase out the vaccine pass.

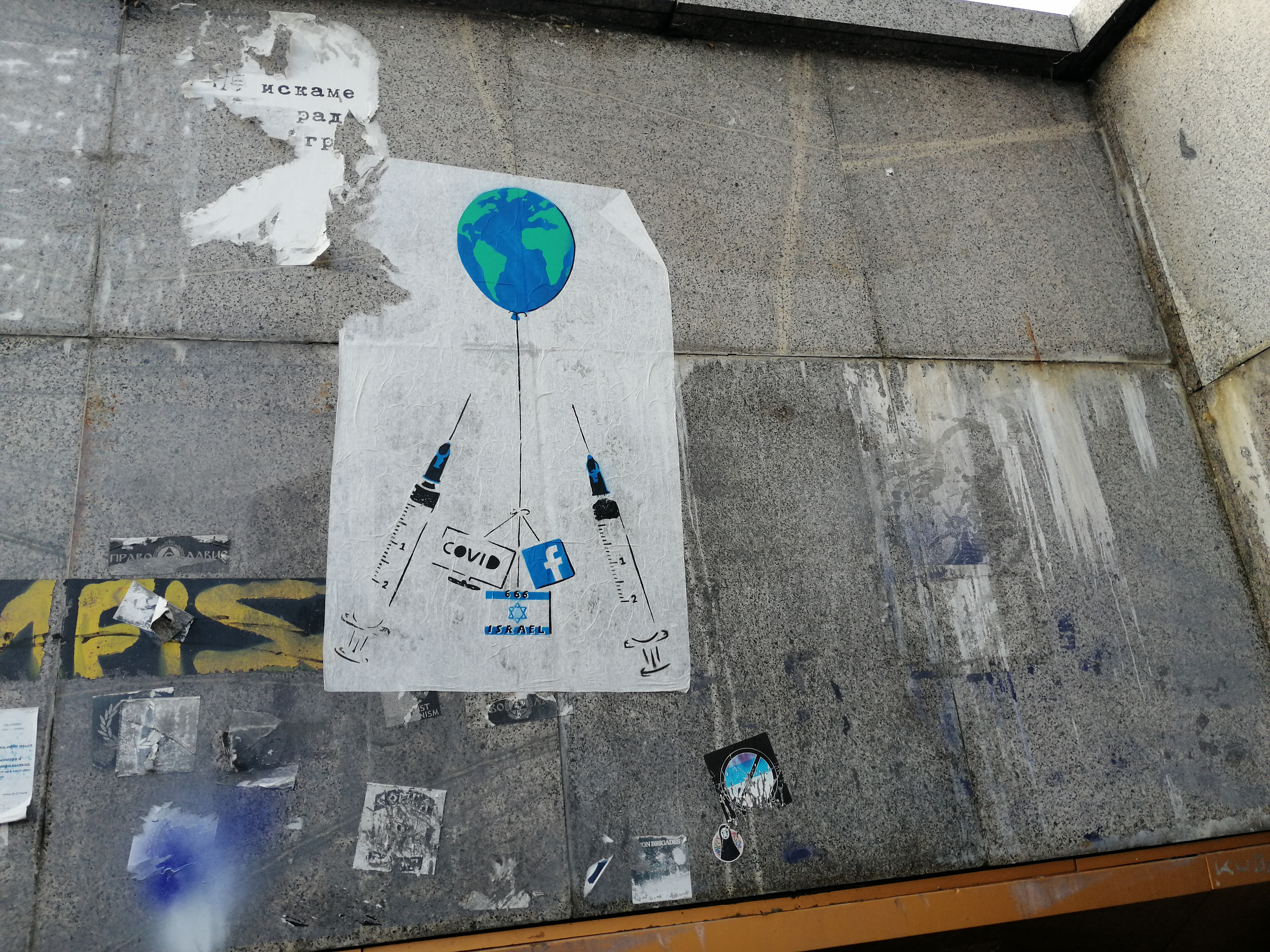
A drawing covering the topic of the COVID-19 vaccination, appearing to give a nod to conspiracy theories regarding the vaccines.

== See also ==
- COVID-19 pandemic in Europe
- Deployment of COVID-19 vaccines
- Statistics of the COVID-19 vaccination
- COVID-19 vaccination in Albania
- COVID-19 vaccination in Bosnia and Herzegovina
- COVID-19 vaccination in Croatia
- COVID-19 vaccination in France
- COVID-19 vaccination in Germany
- COVID-19 vaccination in Greece
- COVID-19 vaccination in Hungary
- COVID-19 vaccination in Italy
- COVID-19 vaccination in Moldova
- COVID-19 vaccination in Norway
- COVID-19 vaccination in the Republic of Ireland
- COVID-19 vaccination in Romania
- COVID-19 vaccination in Russia
- COVID-19 vaccination in Sweden
- COVID-19 vaccination in Switzerland
- COVID-19 vaccination programme in the United Kingdom
