= Deployment of COVID-19 vaccines =

Distribution and administration of COVID-19 vaccinations

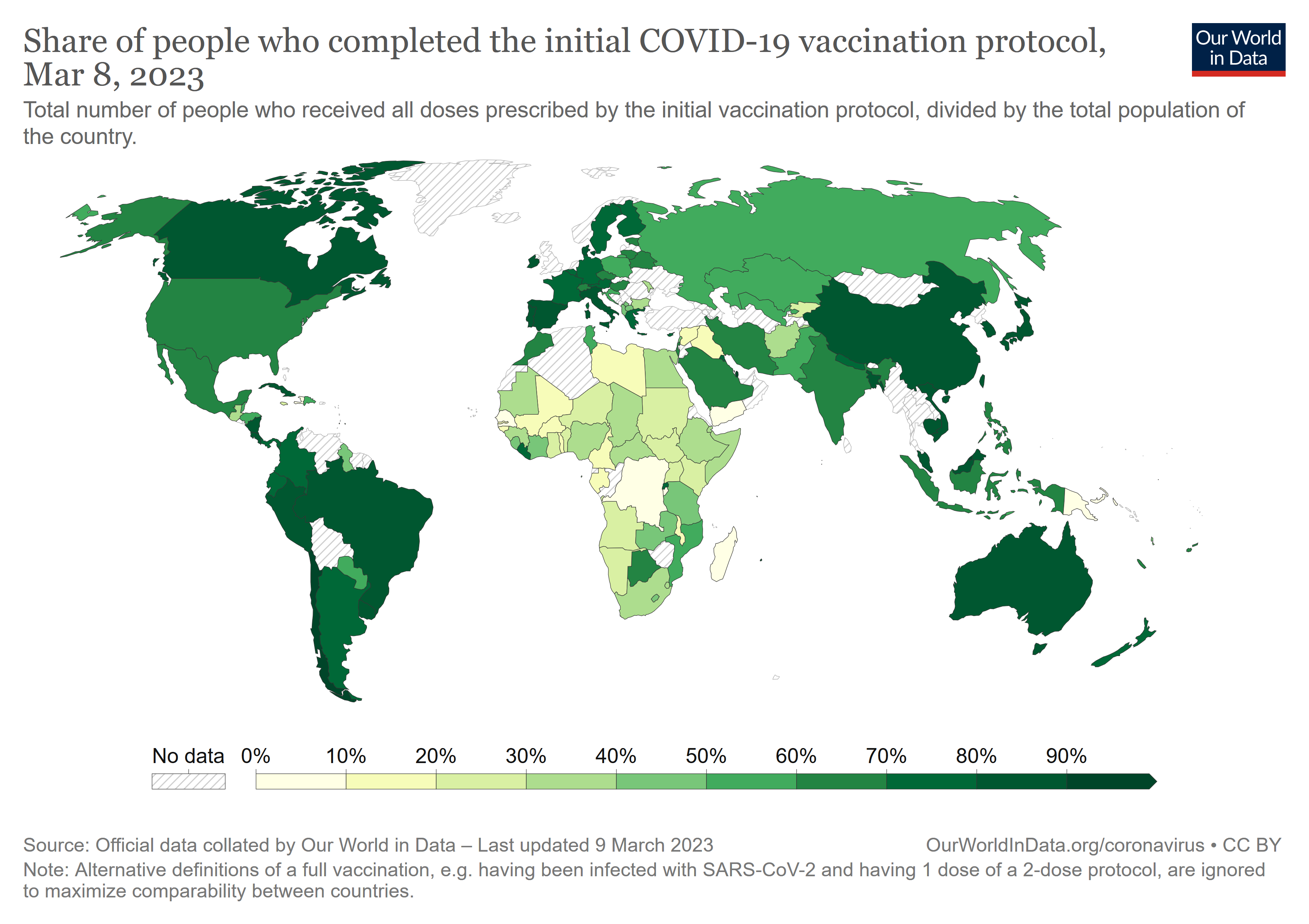
Share of population fully vaccinated against COVID‑19 relative to a country's total population. See date on map.

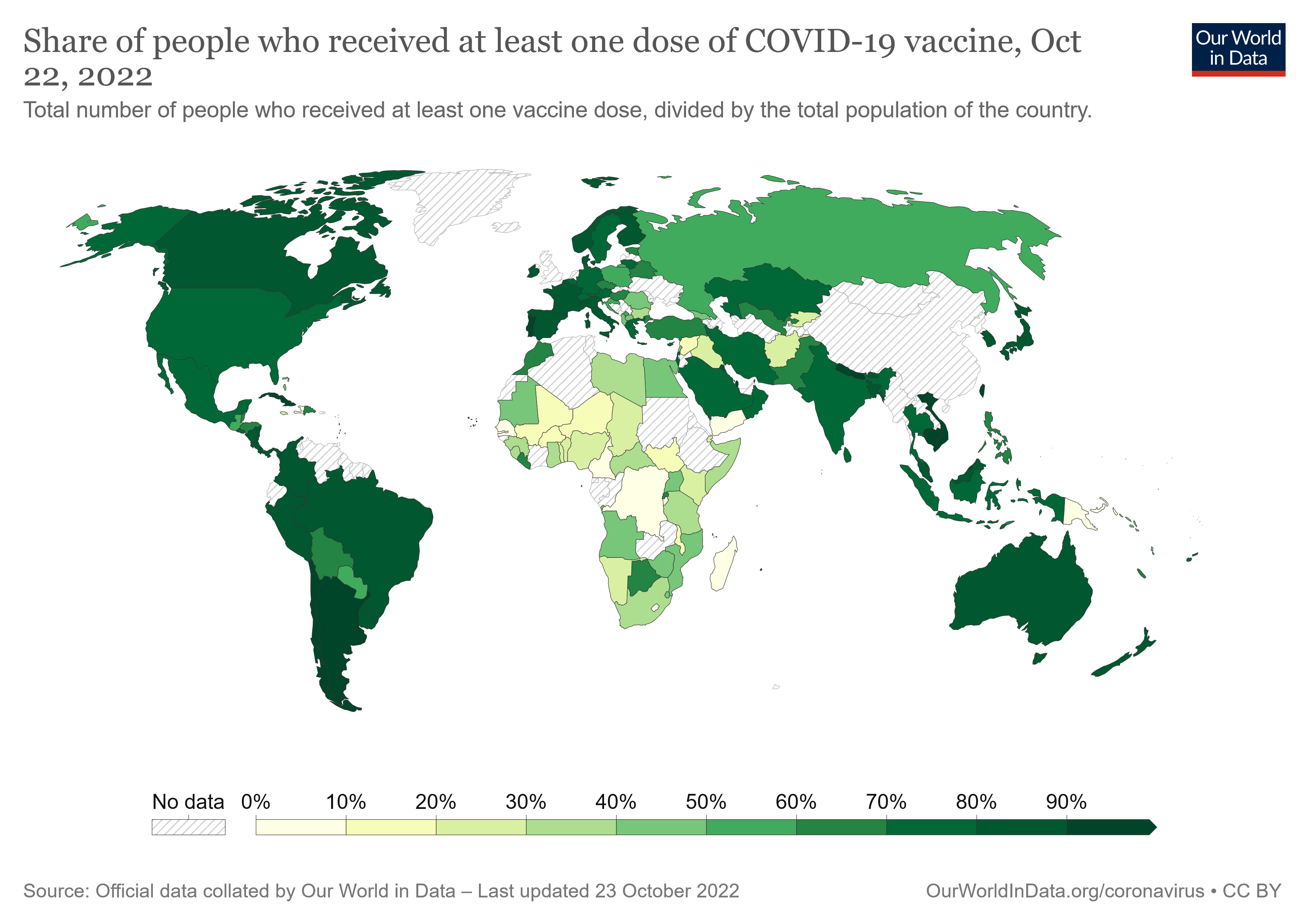
Share of population which has received at least one dose of a COVID‑19 vaccine relative to a country's total population. See date on map.

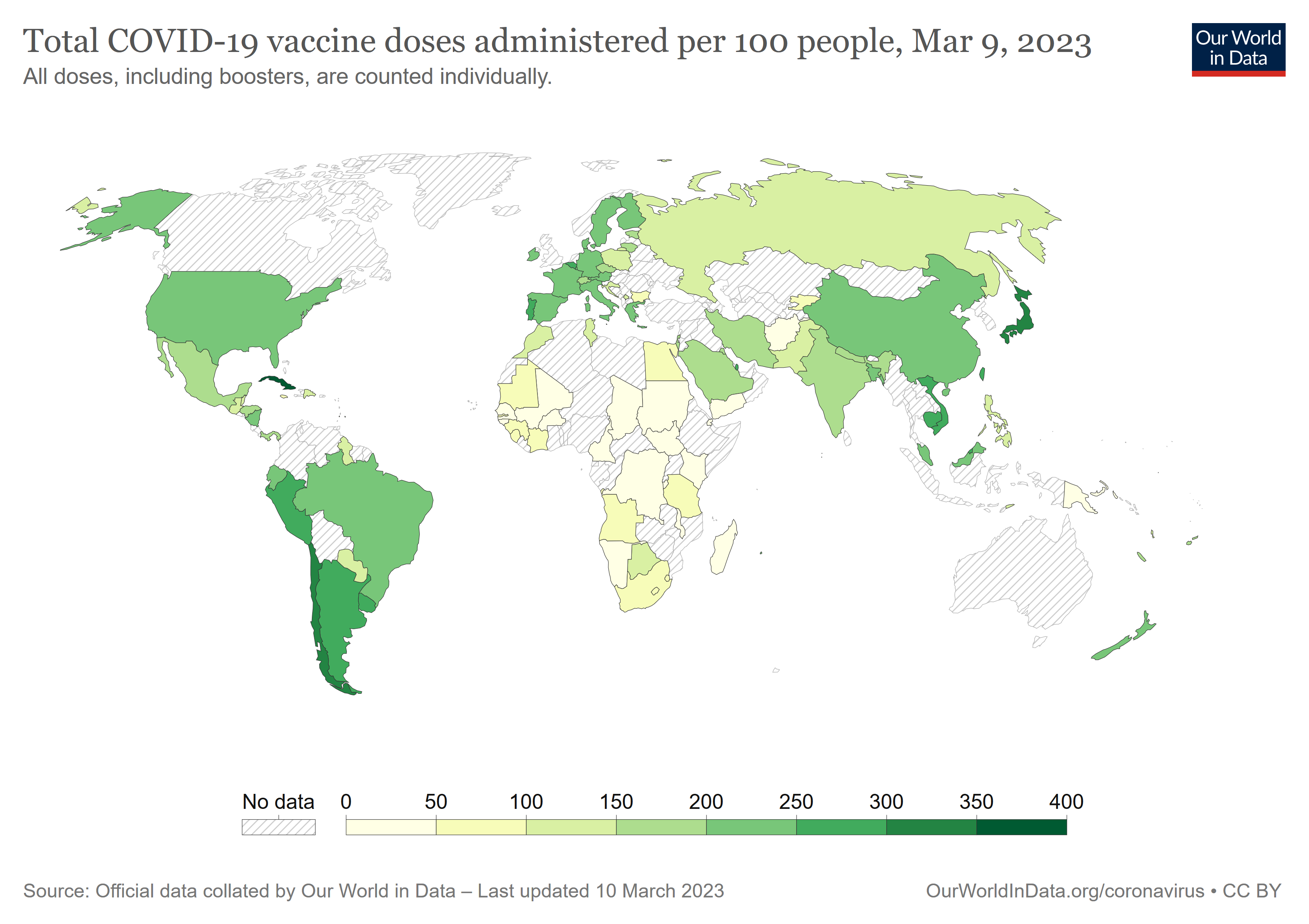
COVID‑19 vaccine doses administered per 100 people by country. See date on map.

As of 12 August 2024, 13.53 billion COVID-19 vaccine doses have been administered worldwide, with 70.6 percent of the global population having received at least one dose. While 4.19 million vaccines were then being administered daily, only 22.3 percent of people in low-income countries had received at least a first vaccine by September 2022, according to official reports from national health agencies, which are collated by Our World in Data.

During a pandemic on the rapid timeline and scale of COVID-19 cases in 2020, international organizations like the World Health Organization (WHO) and Coalition for Epidemic Preparedness Innovations (CEPI), vaccine developers, governments, and industry evaluated the distribution of the eventual vaccine(s). Individual countries producing a vaccine may be persuaded to favor the highest bidder for manufacturing or provide first-class service to their own country. Experts emphasize that licensed vaccines should be available and affordable for people at the frontlines of healthcare and in most need.

In April 2020, it was reported that the UK agreed to work with 20 other countries and global organizations, including France, Germany, and Italy, to find a vaccine and share the results, and that UK citizens would not get preferential access to any new COVID‑19 vaccines developed by taxpayer-funded UK universities. Several companies planned to initially manufacture a vaccine at artificially low prices, then increase prices for profitability later if annual vaccinations are needed and as countries build stock for future needs.

The WHO had set out the target to vaccinate 40% of the population of all countries by the end of 2021 and 70% by mid-2022, but many countries missed the 40% target at the end of 2021.

== Distribution ==
Updated November 5, 2026. (Note: The table data is automatically updated by a bot; see Template:COVID-19 data for more information. See also: Category:Automatically updated COVID-19 pandemic table templates.)

COVID-19 vaccine distribution by country
| | Location | Vaccinated (Note: Number of people who have received at least one dose of a COVID-19 vaccine (unless noted otherwise).) | Percent (Note: Percentage of population that has received at least one dose of a COVID-19 vaccine. May include vaccination of non-citizens, which can push totals beyond 100% of the local population.) |
|---|---|---|---|
| | World (Note: Countries which do not report data for a column are not included in that column's world total.) (Note: Vaccination note: Countries which do not report the number of people who have received at least one dose are not included in the world total.) | 5,645,247,500 | 70.71% |
| (China) | China (Note: Does not include special administrative regions (Hong Kong and Macau) or Taiwan.) | 1,318,026,800 | 92.48% |
| (India) | India | 1,027,438,900 | 72.08% |
| (European Union) | European Union (Note: Data on member states of the European Union are individually listed, but are also summed here for convenience. They are not double-counted in world totals.) | 338,481,060 | 75.43% |
| (United States) | United States (Note: Vaccination note: Includes Freely Associated States) | 270,227,170 | 79.12% |
| (Indonesia) | Indonesia | 204,419,400 | 73.31% |
| (Brazil) | Brazil | 189,643,420 | 90.17% |
| (Pakistan) | Pakistan | 165,567,890 | 67.94% |
| (Bangladesh) | Bangladesh | 151,507,170 | 89.45% |
| (Japan) | Japan | 104,740,060 | 83.79% |
| (Mexico) | Mexico | 97,179,496 | 75.56% |
| (Nigeria) | Nigeria | 93,829,430 | 42.05% |
| (Vietnam) | Vietnam | 90,497,670 | 90.79% |
| (Russia) | Russia | 89,081,600 | 61.19% |
| (Philippines) | Philippines | 82,684,776 | 72.55% |
| (Iran) | Iran | 65,199,830 | 72.83% |
| (Germany) | Germany | 64,876,300 | 77.15% |
| (Turkey) | Turkey | 57,941,052 | 66.55% |
| (Thailand) | Thailand | 57,005,496 | 79.47% |
| (Egypt) | Egypt | 56,907,320 | 50.53% |
| (France) | France | 54,677,680 | 82.50% |
| (United Kingdom) | United Kingdom | 53,806,964 | 78.92% |
| (Ethiopia) | Ethiopia | 52,489,510 | 41.86% |
| (Italy) | Italy (Note: Vaccination note: Includes Vatican City) | 50,936,720 | 85.44% |
| (South Korea) | South Korea | 44,764,956 | 86.45% |
| (Colombia) | Colombia | 43,012,176 | 83.13% |
| (Myanmar) | Myanmar | 41,551,930 | 77.30% |
| (Argentina) | Argentina | 41,529,056 | 91.46% |
| (Spain) | Spain | 41,351,230 | 86.46% |
| (Canada) | Canada | 34,742,936 | 89.49% |
| (Tanzania) | Tanzania | 34,434,932 | 53.21% |
| (Peru) | Peru | 30,563,708 | 91.30% |
| (Malaysia) | Malaysia | 28,138,564 | 81.10% |
| (Nepal) | Nepal | 27,883,196 | 93.83% |
| (Saudi Arabia) | Saudi Arabia | 27,041,364 | 84.04% |
| (Morocco) | Morocco | 25,020,168 | 67.03% |
| (South Africa) | South Africa | 24,210,952 | 38.81% |
| (Poland) | Poland | 22,984,544 | 59.88% |
| (Mozambique) | Mozambique | 22,869,646 | 70.03% |
| (Australia) | Australia | 22,231,734 | 84.85% |
| (Venezuela) | Venezuela | 22,157,232 | 78.54% |
| (Uzbekistan) | Uzbekistan | 22,094,470 | 63.24% |
| (Taiwan) | Taiwan | 21,899,240 | 93.51% |
| (Uganda) | Uganda | 20,033,188 | 42.34% |
| (Afghanistan) | Afghanistan | 19,151,368 | 47.20% |
| (Chile) | Chile | 18,088,516 | 92.51% |
| (Sri Lanka) | Sri Lanka | 17,143,760 | 75.08% |
| (Democratic Republic of the Congo) | Democratic Republic of the Congo | 17,045,720 | 16.65% |
| (Angola) | Angola | 16,550,642 | 46.44% |
| (Ukraine) | Ukraine | 16,267,198 | 39.63% |
| (Ecuador) | Ecuador | 15,345,791 | 86.10% |
| (Cambodia) | Cambodia | 15,316,670 | 89.04% |
| (Sudan) | Sudan | 15,207,452 | 30.79% |
| (Kenya) | Kenya | 14,494,372 | 26.72% |
| (Ghana) | Ghana | 13,864,186 | 41.82% |
| (Ivory Coast) | Ivory Coast | 13,568,372 | 44.64% |
| (Netherlands) | Netherlands | 12,582,081 | 70.27% |
| (Zambia) | Zambia | 11,711,565 | 58.11% |
| (Iraq) | Iraq | 11,332,925 | 25.72% |
| (Rwanda) | Rwanda | 10,884,714 | 79.74% |
| (Kazakhstan) | Kazakhstan | 10,858,101 | 54.20% |
| (Cuba) | Cuba | 10,805,570 | 97.70% |
| (United Arab Emirates) | United Arab Emirates | 9,991,089 | 97.55% |
| (Portugal) | Portugal | 9,821,414 | 94.28% |
| (Belgium) | Belgium | 9,261,641 | 79.55% |
| (Somalia) | Somalia | 8,972,167 | 50.40% |
| (Guatemala) | Guatemala | 8,937,923 | 50.08% |
| (Tunisia) | Tunisia | 8,896,848 | 73.41% |
| (Guinea) | Guinea | 8,715,641 | 62.01% |
| (Greece) | Greece | 7,938,031 | 76.24% |
| (Algeria) | Algeria | 7,840,131 | 17.24% |
| (Sweden) | Sweden | 7,775,726 | 74.14% |
| (Zimbabwe) | Zimbabwe | 7,525,882 | 46.83% |
| (Dominican Republic) | Dominican Republic | 7,367,193 | 65.60% |
| (Bolivia) | Bolivia | 7,361,008 | 60.95% |
| (Israel) | Israel | 7,055,466 | 77.51% |
| (Czech Republic) | Czech Republic | 6,982,006 | 65.42% |
| (Hong Kong) | Hong Kong | 6,920,057 | 92.69% |
| (Austria) | Austria | 6,899,873 | 76.12% |
| (Honduras) | Honduras | 6,596,213 | 63.04% |
| (Belarus) | Belarus | 6,536,392 | 71.25% |
| (Hungary) | Hungary | 6,420,354 | 66.30% |
| (Nicaragua) | Nicaragua | 6,404,524 | 95.15% |
| (Niger) | Niger | 6,248,483 | 24.69% |
| (Switzerland) | Switzerland | 6,096,911 | 69.34% |
| (Burkina Faso) | Burkina Faso | 6,089,089 | 27.05% |
| (Laos) | Laos | 5,888,649 | 77.90% |
| (Sierra Leone) | Sierra Leone | 5,676,123 | 68.58% |
| (Romania) | Romania | 5,474,507 | 28.56% |
| (Malawi) | Malawi | 5,433,538 | 26.42% |
| (Azerbaijan) | Azerbaijan | 5,373,253 | 52.19% |
| (Tajikistan) | Tajikistan | 5,328,277 | 52.33% |
| (Singapore) | Singapore | 5,287,005 | 93.58% |
| (Chad) | Chad | 5,147,667 | 27.89% |
| (Jordan) | Jordan | 4,821,579 | 42.83% |
| (Denmark) | Denmark | 4,746,522 | 80.41% |
| (El Salvador) | El Salvador | 4,659,970 | 74.20% |
| (Costa Rica) | Costa Rica | 4,650,636 | 91.52% |
| (Turkmenistan) | Turkmenistan | 4,614,869 | 63.83% |
| (Finland) | Finland | 4,524,288 | 81.24% |
| (Mali) | Mali | 4,354,292 | 18.87% |
| (Norway) | Norway | 4,346,995 | 79.66% |
| (South Sudan) | South Sudan | 4,315,127 | 39.15% |
| (New Zealand) | New Zealand | 4,302,330 | 83.84% |
| (Republic of Ireland) | Republic of Ireland | 4,112,237 | 80.47% |
| (Paraguay) | Paraguay | 3,995,915 | 59.11% |
| (Liberia) | Liberia | 3,903,802 | 72.65% |
| (Cameroon) | Cameroon | 3,753,733 | 13.58% |
| (Panama) | Panama | 3,746,041 | 85.12% |
| (Benin) | Benin | 3,697,190 | 26.87% |
| (Kuwait) | Kuwait | 3,457,498 | 75.33% |
| (Serbia) | Serbia | 3,354,075 | 49.39% |
| (Syria) | Syria | 3,295,630 | 14.67% |
| (Oman) | Oman | 3,279,632 | 69.33% |
| (Uruguay) | Uruguay | 3,010,464 | 88.78% |
| (Qatar) | Qatar | 2,852,178 | 98.61% |
| (Slovakia) | Slovakia | 2,840,017 | 51.89% |
| (Lebanon) | Lebanon | 2,740,227 | 47.70% |
| (Madagascar) | Madagascar | 2,710,365 | 8.90% |
| (Senegal) | Senegal | 2,684,696 | 15.21% |
| (Central African Republic) | Central African Republic | 2,600,389 | 51.01% |
| (Croatia) | Croatia | 2,323,025 | 59.46% |
| (Libya) | Libya | 2,316,327 | 32.07% |
| (Mongolia) | Mongolia | 2,284,018 | 67.45% |
| (Togo) | Togo | 2,255,579 | 27.95% |
| (Bulgaria) | Bulgaria | 2,155,863 | 31.58% |
| (Mauritania) | Mauritania | 2,103,754 | 43.15% |
| (Palestine) | Palestine | 2,012,767 | 37.94% |
| (Lithuania) | Lithuania | 1,958,299 | 69.52% |
| (Botswana) | Botswana | 1,951,054 | 79.96% |
| (Kyrgyzstan) | Kyrgyzstan | 1,736,541 | 24.97% |
| (Georgia (country)) | Georgia | 1,654,504 | 43.60% |
| (Albania) | Albania | 1,349,255 | 47.72% |
| (Latvia) | Latvia | 1,346,184 | 71.57% |
| (Slovenia) | Slovenia | 1,265,802 | 59.84% |
| (Bahrain) | Bahrain | 1,241,174 | 80.94% |
| (Armenia) | Armenia | 1,150,915 | 39.95% |
| (Mauritius) | Mauritius | 1,123,773 | 88.06% |
| (Moldova) | Moldova | 1,109,524 | 36.50% |
| (Yemen) | Yemen | 1,050,202 | 2.75% |
| (Lesotho) | Lesotho | 1,014,073 | 44.36% |
| (Bosnia and Herzegovina) | Bosnia and Herzegovina | 943,394 | 29.44% |
| (Kosovo) | Kosovo | 906,858 | 52.79% |
| (Timor-Leste) | Timor-Leste | 886,838 | 64.77% |
| (Estonia) | Estonia | 870,202 | 64.45% |
| (Jamaica) | Jamaica | 859,773 | 30.28% |
| (North Macedonia) | North Macedonia | 854,570 | 46.44% |
| (Trinidad and Tobago) | Trinidad and Tobago | 754,399 | 50.43% |
| (Guinea-Bissau) | Guinea-Bissau | 747,057 | 35.48% |
| (Fiji) | Fiji | 712,025 | 77.44% |
| (Bhutan) | Bhutan | 699,116 | 89.52% |
| (Republic of the Congo) | Republic of the Congo | 695,760 | 11.53% |
| (Macau) | Macau | 679,703 | 96.50% |
| (The Gambia) | Gambia | 674,314 | 25.58% |
| (Cyprus) | Cyprus | 671,193 | 71.37% |
| (Namibia) | Namibia | 629,767 | 21.79% |
| (Eswatini) | Eswatini | 526,050 | 43.16% |
| (Haiti) | Haiti | 521,396 | 4.53% |
| (Guyana) | Guyana | 497,550 | 60.56% |
| (Luxembourg) | Luxembourg | 481,957 | 73.77% |
| (Malta) | Malta | 478,953 | 90.68% |
| (Brunei) | Brunei | 451,149 | 99.07% |
| (Comoros) | Comoros | 438,825 | 52.60% |
| (Djibouti) | Djibouti | 421,573 | 37.07% |
| (Maldives) | Maldives | 399,308 | 76.19% |
| (Papua New Guinea) | Papua New Guinea | 382,020 | 3.74% |
| (Cape Verde) | Cabo Verde | 356,734 | 68.64% |
| (Solomon Islands) | Solomon Islands | 343,821 | 44.02% |
| (Gabon) | Gabon | 311,244 | 12.80% |
| (Iceland) | Iceland | 309,770 | 81.44% |
| (Northern Cyprus) | Northern Cyprus | 301,673 | 78.80% |
| (Montenegro) | Montenegro | 292,783 | 47.63% |
| (Equatorial Guinea) | Equatorial Guinea | 270,109 | 14.98% |
| (Suriname) | Suriname | 267,820 | 42.98% |
| (Belize) | Belize | 258,473 | 64.18% |
| (New Caledonia) | New Caledonia | 192,375 | 67.00% |
| (Samoa) | Samoa | 191,403 | 88.91% |
| (French Polynesia) | French Polynesia | 190,908 | 68.09% |
| (Vanuatu) | Vanuatu | 176,624 | 56.42% |
| (The Bahamas) | Bahamas | 174,810 | 43.97% |
| (Barbados) | Barbados | 163,853 | 58.04% |
| (São Tomé and Príncipe) | Sao Tome and Principe | 140,256 | 61.97% |
| (Curaçao) | Curaçao | 108,601 | 58.59% |
| (Kiribati) | Kiribati | 100,900 | 77.33% |
| (Aruba) | Aruba | 90,546 | 84.00% |
| (Seychelles) | Seychelles | 88,520 | 70.52% |
| (Tonga) | Tonga | 87,375 | 83.17% |
| (Jersey) | Jersey | 84,365 | 81.52% |
| (Isle of Man) | Isle of Man | 69,560 | 82.66% |
| (Antigua and Barbuda) | Antigua and Barbuda | 64,290 | 69.24% |
| (Cayman Islands) | Cayman Islands | 62,113 | 86.74% |
| (Saint Lucia) | Saint Lucia | 60,140 | 33.64% |
| (Andorra) | Andorra | 57,913 | 72.64% |
| (Guernsey) | Guernsey | 54,223 | 85.06% |
| (Bermuda) | Bermuda | 48,554 | 74.96% |
| (Grenada) | Grenada | 44,241 | 37.84% |
| (Gibraltar) | Gibraltar | 42,175 | 112.08% |
| (Faroe Islands) | Faroe Islands | 41,715 | 77.19% |
| (Greenland) | Greenland | 41,227 | 73.60% |
| (Saint Vincent and the Grenadines) | Saint Vincent and the Grenadines | 37,532 | 36.77% |
| (Burundi) | Burundi | 36,909 | 0.28% |
| (Saint Kitts and Nevis) | Saint Kitts and Nevis | 33,794 | 72.31% |
| (Dominica) | Dominica | 32,995 | 49.36% |
| (Turks and Caicos Islands) | Turks and Caicos Islands | 32,815 | 71.54% |
| (Sint Maarten) | Sint Maarten | 29,788 | 70.65% |
| (Monaco) | Monaco | 28,875 | 74.13% |
| (Liechtenstein) | Liechtenstein | 26,771 | 68.05% |
| (San Marino) | San Marino | 26,357 | 77.26% |
| (British Virgin Islands) | British Virgin Islands | 19,466 | 50.76% |
| (Caribbean Netherlands) | Caribbean Netherlands | 19,109 | 66.69% |
| (Cook Islands) | Cook Islands | 15,112 | 102.48% |
| (Nauru) | Nauru | 13,106 | 110.86% |
| (Anguilla) | Anguilla | 10,858 | 76.45% |
| (Tuvalu) | Tuvalu | 9,763 | 97.51% |
| (Wallis and Futuna) | Wallis and Futuna | 7,150 | 62.17% |
| (Saint Helena, Ascension and Tristan da Cunha) | Saint Helena, Ascension and Tristan da Cunha | 4,361 | 81.23% |
| (Falkland Islands) | Falkland Islands | 2,632 | 74.88% |
| (Tokelau) | Tokelau | 2,203 | 95.29% |
| (Montserrat) | Montserrat | 2,104 | 47.01% |
| (Niue) | Niue | 1,638 | 88.83% |
| (Pitcairn Islands) | Pitcairn Islands | 47 | 100.00% |
| (North Korea) | North Korea | 0 | 0.00% |

=== Phased distribution ===
Many countries have implemented phased distribution plans that prioritize those at highest risk of complications such as the elderly and those at high risk of exposure and transmission such as healthcare workers.

In the United States, the Advisory Committee on Immunization Practices (ACIP) of the Centers for Disease Control and Prevention (CDC) voted in December 2020, that the first doses of the vaccine should be prioritized for healthcare workers and residents and staff of nursing homes. ACIP recommended that the second phase of distribution (Phase 1b) include persons aged ≥75 years and non-healthcare frontline essential workers such as those employed in grocery stores, restaurants, military, law enforcement, fire departments, retail, sanitation, schools, public transportation, self-storage, hotels, warehousing, and news media. However, states control the final plans for prioritization, distribution, and logistics of vaccinating everyone as supply becomes available.

The European Union began phased vaccine rollout on 27 December 2020. Each member state is managing distribution with a common focus on prioritizing healthcare workers, people at high risk of exposure, the elderly, and those with serious health conditions.

The COVID‑19 vaccination programme in the United Kingdom prioritized elder care facility residents and carers, followed by healthcare workers and those over 80 years of age. Subsequent phases are based largely on age, declining from 75 years in 5-year increments.

Some countries used accelerated dose 1 plans with extended dose 2 intervals after the first dose in order to extend vaccination to as many people as possible until vaccine availability improved. Data suggests that people who have recovered from COVID-19 may only require a single dose of an mRNA vaccine to reach full two dose immunity.

=== Mixed series ===
The use of the different vaccines in a two-shot regimen is not widespread; there is no data on the efficacy of mixed series for COVID-19 vaccines but such series are not expected to be unsafe or ineffective. The US Centers for Disease Control and Prevention (CDC) recommends the use of a mixed series only in exceptional circumstances, such as where a second dose of the same vaccine cannot be delivered in a reasonable timeframe. In Canada, authorities were investigating the effectiveness of a mixed series and ultimately recommended the use of a first shot consisting of the Oxford-AstraZeneca COVID-19 vaccine, followed by one of the mRNA vaccines. In June 2021, German authorities recommended using mRNA vaccines as a second shot after an AstraZeneca shot in younger people as a precaution to avoid a rare blood clotting side effect associated with the AstraZeneca vaccine. Thailand began mixing-and-matching doses of the AstraZeneca and Sinovac vaccines in July 2021 amid concerns about the Sinovac vaccine's long-term protection.

=== Equitable access ===
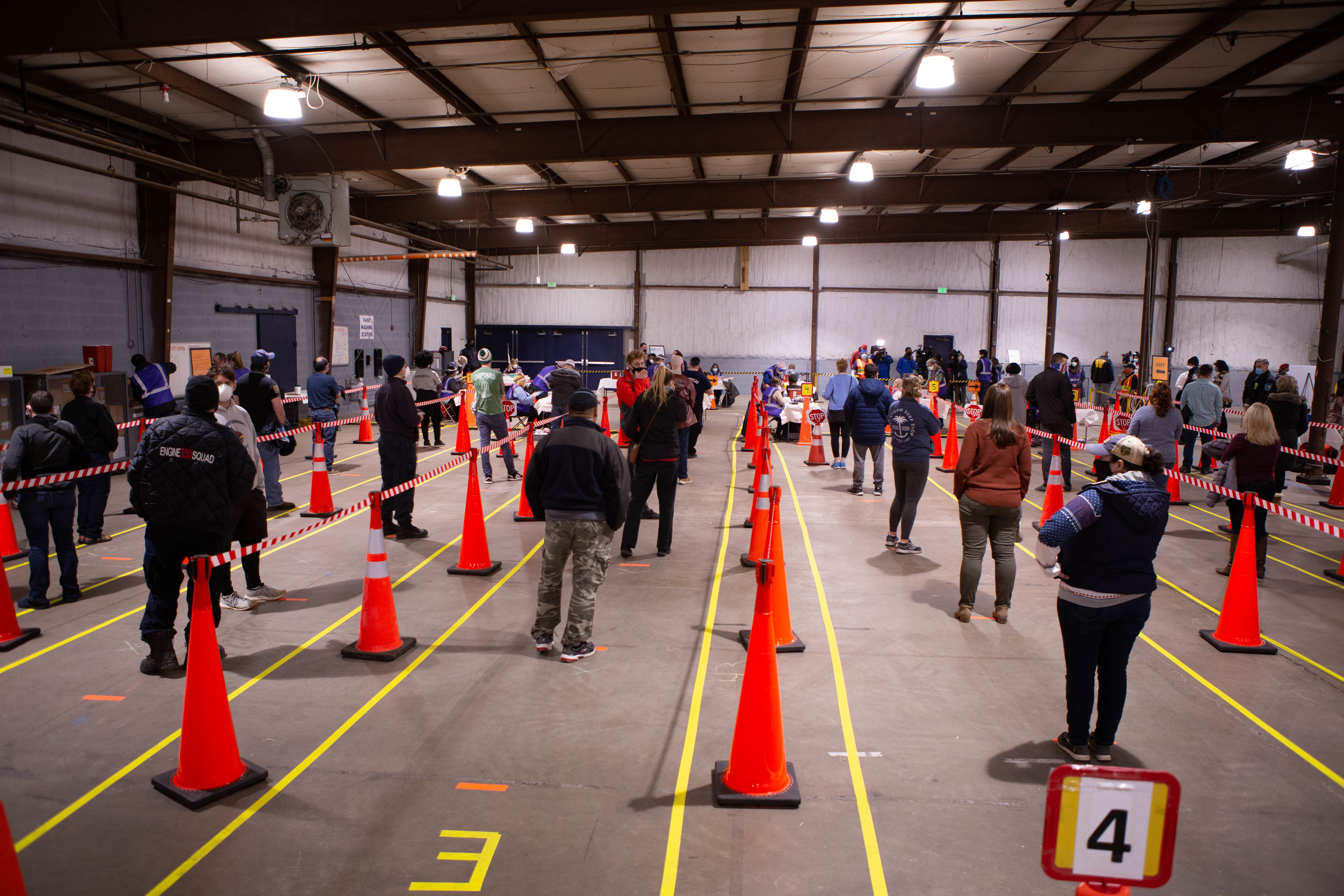
Health officials distribute the Moderna COVID-19 vaccine to frontline health workers and first responders in Baltimore County, Maryland, United States.

During 2020, as the COVID‑19 pandemic escalated globally and vaccine development intensified, the World Health Organization (WHO) COVAX facility adopted the motto "No one is safe unless everyone is safe" to emphasize the need for equitable vaccination. The facility set a goal of supplying COVID‑19 vaccines to nearly 100 low-to-middle income countries that could not afford them. COVAX sought to fundraise US$6.8 billion to purchase and deliver vaccines to participating countries in proportion to their populations. On 18 December 2020, the facility announced agreements with vaccine manufacturers to supply 1.3 billion doses for 92 low-middle income countries in the first half of 2021.

Yet, by mid-December, some 16 countries representing only 14% of the world's population had preordered more than 10 billion vaccine doses or about 51% of the available world supply. Specifically, Canada, Australia, and Japan – having only 1% of the world's COVID‑19 cases – had collectively reserved some 1 billion vaccine doses, while the COVAX facility had reserved only a few hundred million doses. At the Group of Seven summit in June 2021, the United States promised to distribute 500 million vaccine doses internationally; this distribution began on 17 August.

Preorders from rich countries were made during 2020 with 13 different vaccine manufacturers, whereas those for low-to-middle income countries were made primarily for the Oxford–AstraZeneca COVID-19 vaccine, which is lowest in cost and has no special refrigeration needs.

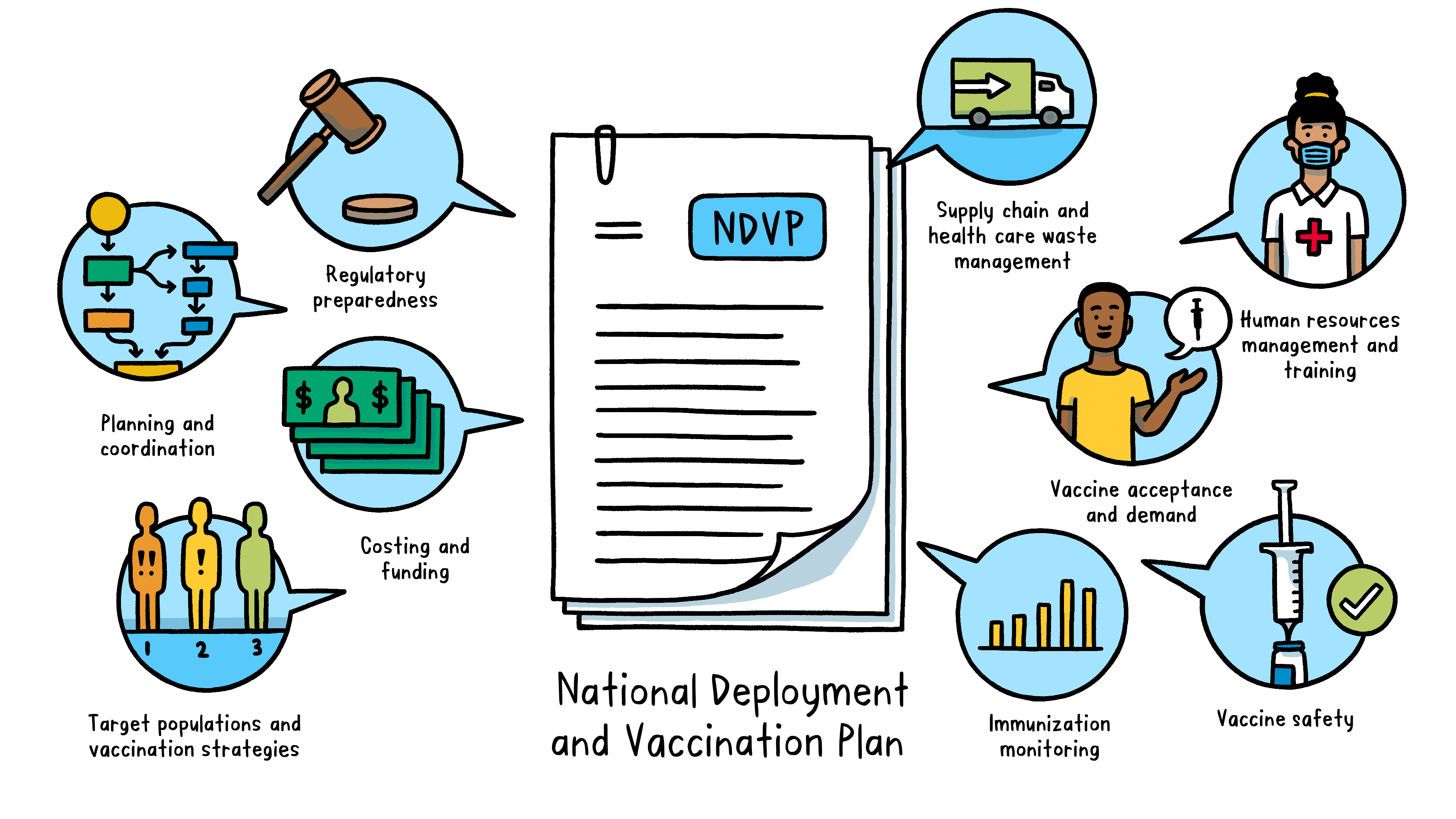
World Health Organization communication describing factors involved in National Plans for Vaccines

The CEPI, the WHO, and charitable vaccine organizations, such as the Gates Foundation and GAVI, raised over US$20 billion during the first half of 2020, to fund vaccine development and preparedness for vaccinations, particularly for children in under-developed countries. CEPI, which was created to monitor fair distribution of infectious disease vaccines to low- and middle-income countries, has recommended considering manufacturing capacity, financing and purchasing, and releasing vaccine developers from liability. Despite opposition from some vaccine manufacturers, CEPI revised its February 2020 equitable access policy to apply specifically to its COVID‑19 vaccine funding:

1. "prices for vaccines will be set as low as possible for territories that are or may be affected by an outbreak of a disease for which CEPI funding was used to develop a vaccine;
2. "information, know-how and materials related to vaccine development must be shared with (or transferred to) CEPI" so that it can assume responsibility for vaccine development if a company discontinues expenditures for a promising vaccine candidate;
3. CEPI would have access to, and possible management of, intellectual property rights (i.e., patents) for promising vaccines;
4. "CEPI would receive a share of financial benefits that might accrue from CEPI-sponsored vaccine development, to re-invest in support of its mission to provide global public health benefit"; and
5. data transparency among development partners should maintain the WHO Statement on Public Disclosure of Clinical Trial Results, and require results to be published in open-access publications.

International groups, such as the Centre for Artistic Activism and Universities Allied for Essential Medicines, advocate for equitable access. Scientists have encouraged collaboration between the WHO, CEPI, corporations, and governments to ensure that vaccines are distributed in an evidence-based manner based on infection risk and to prioritize healthcare workers, vulnerable populations, and children.

By mid-March 2021, 67 countries, mostly in Africa and the Middle East, had not yet reported any vaccinations. Countries that had begun vaccinations were generally prioritizing populations such as health workers or the elderly. It has also been suggested that elective surgery recipients should be prioritized since a patient recovering from surgery would be more vulnerable than average. Some expressed concern over the short shelf-life of the Moderna and Pfizer-BioNTech vaccines, which expire within hours after being removed from the freezer; they argued that, once the vaccine is unfrozen, it is better to apply these doses to anyone who can be found rather than discard the doses.

As of March 2021, the United States had ordered twice the necessary doses to cover its own population, but it remained unclear when it might share surplus doses with other countries. In April 2021, Vanity Fair reported that it would be difficult to share surplus doses with other countries because the U.S. government had expressly agreed in its contracts with vaccine manufacturers to use doses only in the United States and its territories. The manufacturers requested this clause because most other countries do not have liability protections for vaccines as expansive as the Public Readiness and Emergency Preparedness Act.

In late November 2021 the World Health Organization published, "it is vitally important that inequities in access to COVID-19 vaccines are urgently addressed to ensure that vulnerable groups everywhere, including health workers and older persons, receive their first and second doses, alongside equitable access to treatment and diagnostics." Inequalities in vaccine distribution facilitate the emergence of new variants like SARS-CoV-2 Omicron variant.

==== Concerns ====
An analysis conducted in late 2020 of premarket vaccine purchase commitments indicated that wealthy countries may receive their vaccines in 2020–21 while developing countries may be excluded from vaccinations until 2023–24. Data from April 2021 comports with this expectation since 25% of the population in high income countries have been vaccinated compared to only 0.2% in low income countries.

The head of the World Health Organization said on 4 August 2021 that rich countries had administered about 100 doses per 100 people while poor countries had administered only about 1.5 doses for every 100 people, and therefore, in his estimation, it was important to prioritize vaccination in poor countries before offering booster vaccines in rich countries. The WHO Director General Tedros Adhanom Ghedreyesus raised concerns about rich countries hoarding vaccines at the expense of citizens in poorer nations who wait for vaccines to either become available or are donated. The WHO Regional Office of Africa highlighted vaccine discard in African countries, after Nigeria destroyed about 1 million donated doses of AstraZeneca vaccine after being donated with only a few weeks till expiration. Other countries such as Malawi, and South Sudan have either destroyed expired or close to expiring vaccines or paused donated shipments due to expiration concerns.

==== Discarding ====
It is estimated that least 215 million doses of COVID-19 vaccines purchased by EU countries have been discarded as per 2023, based on vaccine prices reported in the media.

=== Intellectual property ===
The first polio vaccine was never patented; some have argued that similar treatment of an effective COVID‑19 vaccine could enable fair distribution.

Initially, negotiations at the World Trade Organization (WTO) on the issue of waiving patent rights were blocked for months by resistance by the US, Switzerland, Norway, and the EU. Initially one observer considered the US position unlikely to change, but as of April 2021 the US administration was discussing the issue and then reversed course and announced its support for a patent waiver for COVID-19 vaccines on 5 May 2021. 400 non-profit organizations and 115 members of the European Commission have signed a letter urging the United States and Europe to side with the WTO members in the global south.

==== Debate ====
Some question if patent waiver proposals formulated for small molecule drugs can be applied to complex biologics like vaccines. One vaccine production expert argued that "there is an unrecognized gap in understanding ... nearly all of the people who are providing views on the value of removing patent protections have zero experience in vaccine development and manufacturing." Indeed, most of the advocacy in favor of patent waivers has come from the public health community (which has drawn inspiration from the history of raucous HIV/AIDS activism in the 1980s and 1990s), while most members of the vaccinology community (i.e., actual experts on development and production of vaccines) have effectively refused to lend their credibility to such proposals by either remaining silent or refusing to take any position.

Small molecule drugs are easy to copy and can be quickly brought to market by generic drug manufacturers who are not required to run their own full-scale clinical trials because they can piggyback on regulatory approvals obtained by original drug manufacturers. In contrast, "there is no such thing as generic vaccines". The manufacturer of each independently developed vaccine (including a purported copy of an existing vaccine) must run its own clinical trials to establish safety and efficacy. Independent copying of an existing first-generation vaccine is so hard that the resulting second-generation vaccine is often a significant improvement over the first-generation technology and is itself patentable.

Although Moderna has stated that it will not seek enforcement of its patents during the pandemic, a patent waiver (voluntary or involuntary) would not force a vaccine manufacturer to disclose the complete knowledge (i.e., know-how) for making a vaccine, which is not found in patents. The World Health Organization (WHO) has promoted the COVID-19 Technology Access Pool to facilitate disclosures, but participation is voluntary and none of the vaccine manufacturers have joined. Without access to the original vaccine manufacturer's know-how, reverse engineering the manufacturing process is difficult and expensive with no guarantee of success. Even if a third party succeeds, they must prove that fact to the satisfaction of regulatory authorities. For small molecule drugs, proving bioequivalence of a generic drug to the original drug costs only about US$1 to $2 million; but for biologics, proving biosimilarity of a third-party product to the original product requires clinical trials, with costs ranging from US$100 to $250 million. One financial analyst specializing in pharmaceuticals estimated that it would take a minimum of two years after patent waiver for the first independent reproductions of a COVID-19 vaccine to reach the market, which may be too long to have any net impact on global public health. While discussing the idea of "open source" COVID-19 vaccine manufacturing, Bill Gates said: "There's not a single additional vaccine that would have come out of that .... no free IP would have improved anything related to this pandemic." His foundation has instead helped other countries reach licensing deals as in the case of the Oxford/AstraZeneca vaccine being produced by India's Serum Institute. Another concern, raised by Pfizer CEO Albert Bourla, is that allowing unauthorized third-party vaccine production would severely disrupt vaccine developers' efforts to ramp up vaccine production when original developers and third-party producers all end up competing for the same scarce raw materials.

This is why some conclude that voluntary technology transfers are the superior option for producing more doses—since the transferor's active assistance can help the transferee bypass time-consuming clinical trials by taking advantage of existing approvals for the transferor's vaccine—and others describe patent waiver proposals as "more symbolic than practical". Derek Lowe has characterized the U.S. government's May 2021 announcement of support for patent waiver proposals as "almost as much of a PR move as anything else". By November 2021, the prospects for approval of such proposals (which by WTO tradition must be unanimous) looked increasingly remote; participants criticized the United States for not working to bridge the gap between supporters and opponents. Meanwhile, Tedros Adhanom Ghebreyesus has rejected the dichotomy between waiving patents and initiating technology transfers by including both measures as part of a list of four steps towards increasing vaccine production. He pointed out that the TRIPS agreement signed by all members of the WTO already allows for an emergency waiver of intellectual property rights in countries with free manufacturing capacities.

Several observers have noted that the vaccine patent waiver debate involves an issue expected to outlast the COVID-19 pandemic: who will control the broader technology of RNA therapeutics. Howard Dean has accused Narendra Modi of trying to gain access to such technology by promoting the "disingenuous" claim that patent waivers will accelerate vaccine production. Josh Rogin has pointed out that control of mRNA technology has "national security implications" for the United States, and that its development was initially funded by U.S. taxpayers through DARPA for that reason.

Central to the debate is whether profits from strong intellectual property rights are necessary to ensure that someone will conduct the applied research which turns promising laboratory experiments into marketable drugs and vaccines. Such research is dauntingly expensive (on average, $3 billion per successful drug) and nearly always fails (only 12 percent of drugs which enter clinical trials ultimately obtain FDA approval), and "governments have neither the money nor the risk tolerance to take over the role of businesses in developing pharmacy-ready medicines". Moderna co-founder Robert S. Langer has argued that early private investors deserve "a lot of credit" for its successful COVID-19 vaccine since they "put the money in way before" the U.S. federal government got involved, and thereby laid the foundation for the company's success many years later.

The risk of waiving patents for COVID-19 vaccines is that it sets a precedent which may discourage the private sector from future investments in vaccines and other lifesaving technologies, and in turn, future technologies not yet developed will never come to market when the public sector fails to pick up the slack. As one financial analyst explained: "It would be intensively counterproductive, in the extreme, because what it would say to the industry is: 'Don't work on anything that we really care about, because if you do, we're just going to take it away from you.'" The "most depressing" worst-case outcome is that pharmaceutical firms give up on saving lives and focus on inventing quality of life treatments which are more profitable and less likely to be expropriated; the most notorious examples of such treatments are Pfizer's Viagra and Allergan's Botox. The "threat of losing developers is real" in the vaccine sector, which had withered away to only a handful of companies by the turn of the 21st century and by 2021 had only recently begun to grow again. However, Peter Bach has argued that whether this risk might be worth it deserves to be frankly debated: "If this action allows for more access and more people to have their lives saved today in 2021 and the consequence is down the road we may not have some new gene therapy for 100 kids, then that's the trade-off worth discussing".

=== Sovereignty ===
Favored distribution of vaccines within one or a few select countries, called "vaccine sovereignty", is a criticism of some of the vaccine development partnerships, such as for the AstraZeneca-University of Oxford vaccine candidate, concerning whether there may be prioritized distribution first within the UK and to the "highest bidder" – the United States, which made an advance payment of US$1.2 billion to secure 300 million vaccine doses for Americans, even before the AstraZeneca-Oxford vaccine or a Sanofi vaccine was proved safe or effective. Concerns exist about whether some countries producing vaccines may impose protectionist controls by export restrictions that would stockpile a COVID‑19 vaccine for their own population.

The Chinese government pledged in May 2020, that a successful Chinese vaccine would become a "global, public good", implying enough doses would be manufactured for both national and global distribution. Unlike mRNA vaccines, which have to be stored at subzero temperatures, inactivated vaccines from Sinovac and Sinopharm require ordinary refrigeration and may have more appeal in developing countries. In November 2021, the Chinese government pledged to donate in 2022 a further 600 million vaccine doses to Africa, and supply another 400 million through other routes including production by Chinese companies in Africa.

In June 2020, the Serum Institute of India (SII) – a major manufacturer of global vaccines – reached a licensing agreement with AstraZeneca to make 1 billion doses of vaccine for low-and-middle income countries, of which half of the doses would go to India. Similar preferential homeland distribution may exist if a vaccine is manufactured in Australia.

=== Illegal distribution ===
In the United States, the vaccine distribution line, while varying by state, has placed healthcare workers and senior citizens high on the list for COVID-19 vaccination, while less essential workers are secondary recipients. Due to the long process of distribution, some individuals tried to secure a more favorable position on the vaccination list, such as by bribery or making donations to hospitals. In response, state governments imposed large fines and other penalties for violation of federal vaccine distribution guidelines. A COVID-19 vaccine black market enabled some individuals to buy illegal early access to a vaccine.

By mid-February 2021, China had arrested 80 people involved in vaccine contraband, and the Colombian government intercepted a freezer with 70 doses of a Chinese-manufactured vaccine that a traveler brought with her into the airport without any accompanying paperwork.

=== Vaccine tourism ===
In the later half of February 2021, it was reported that wealthy and influential people from Canada and European countries flew to the United Arab Emirates to secure early access to the vaccine. The UAE promoted Dubai as a vaccine holiday hub for the wealthy, who could pay a large sum of money to get inoculated before they became eligible for vaccination in their home countries. Some Canadians who maintained second homes in the United States were able to get vaccines earlier.

As restrictions on vaccine eligibility were lowered in the United States, wealthier individuals from other countries with slower vaccination rates were reportedly travelling to the United States to be vaccinated. The U.S. state of Alaska announced in April 2021 that it would intentionally offer free vaccinations to tourists at major Alaskan airports starting 1 June 2021. In an effort to guard against vaccine tourism, Greece restricted its eligibility to those with a social security number. However, this had the effect of excluding part of the elderly or immigrant population as well as some Greek citizens who worked abroad before the pandemic.

In the European Union, several travel agencies offered "vaccine vacations". The Maldives also offered vaccines as part of holiday travel packages.

== Cost ==
An effective vaccine for COVID‑19 could save trillions of dollars in global economic impact, according to economists Arnab Acharya and Sanjay Reddy who advocate suspending patent protections for vaccines temporarily and compensating the affected companies. Any price tag in the billions would therefore look small in comparison. In early stages of the pandemic, it was not known if it would be possible to create a safe, reliable and affordable vaccine for this virus, and it was not known exactly how much the vaccine development could cost. Even with several vaccines on the market, the antigenicity changes in new variants of the virus mean that the billions of dollars could still be invested without success.

Before an effective vaccine was developed, it was clear that billions of doses would need to be manufactured and distributed worldwide. In April 2020, the Gates Foundation estimated that manufacturing and distribution could cost as much as US$25 billion. Gates also admitted "Ideally, there would be global agreement about who should get the vaccine first, but given how many competing interests there are, this is unlikely to happen". From Phase I clinical trials, 84–90% of vaccine candidates fail to make it to final approval during development, and from Phase III, 25.7% fail – the investment by a manufacturer in a vaccine candidate may exceed US$1 billion and end with millions of useless doses given advanced manufacturing agreements. In the case of the Oxford-AstraZeneca COVID-19 vaccine, 97% of this came from public financing.

As of November 2020, companies subsidized under the United States' Operation Warp Speed program have set initial pricing at US$19.50 to US$25 per dose, in line with the influenza vaccine. In December 2020, a Belgian politician briefly published the confidential prices agreed between vaccine producers and the EU:

| Manufacturer | COVID-19 vaccine | Price per dose | |
| Manufacturer | COVID-19 vaccine | EUR | USD |
|---|---|---|---|
| AstraZeneca | Oxford–AstraZeneca vaccine | €1.78 | |
| Janssen Pharmaceuticals | Janssen vaccine | €7.16 | US$8.50 |
| Sanofi and GlaxoSmithKline (GSK) | Sanofi–GSK vaccine | €7.56 | |
| R-Pharm | Sputnik V vaccine | €8.43 | US$10.00 |
| Sinopharm | Sinopharm BIBP vaccine | €8.43 | US$10.00 |
| CureVac | CureVac vaccine | €10.00 | |
| Pfizer and BioNTech | Pfizer–BioNTech vaccine | €12.00 | |
| Moderna | Moderna vaccine | €15.17 | US$18.00 |

== Supply chain ==
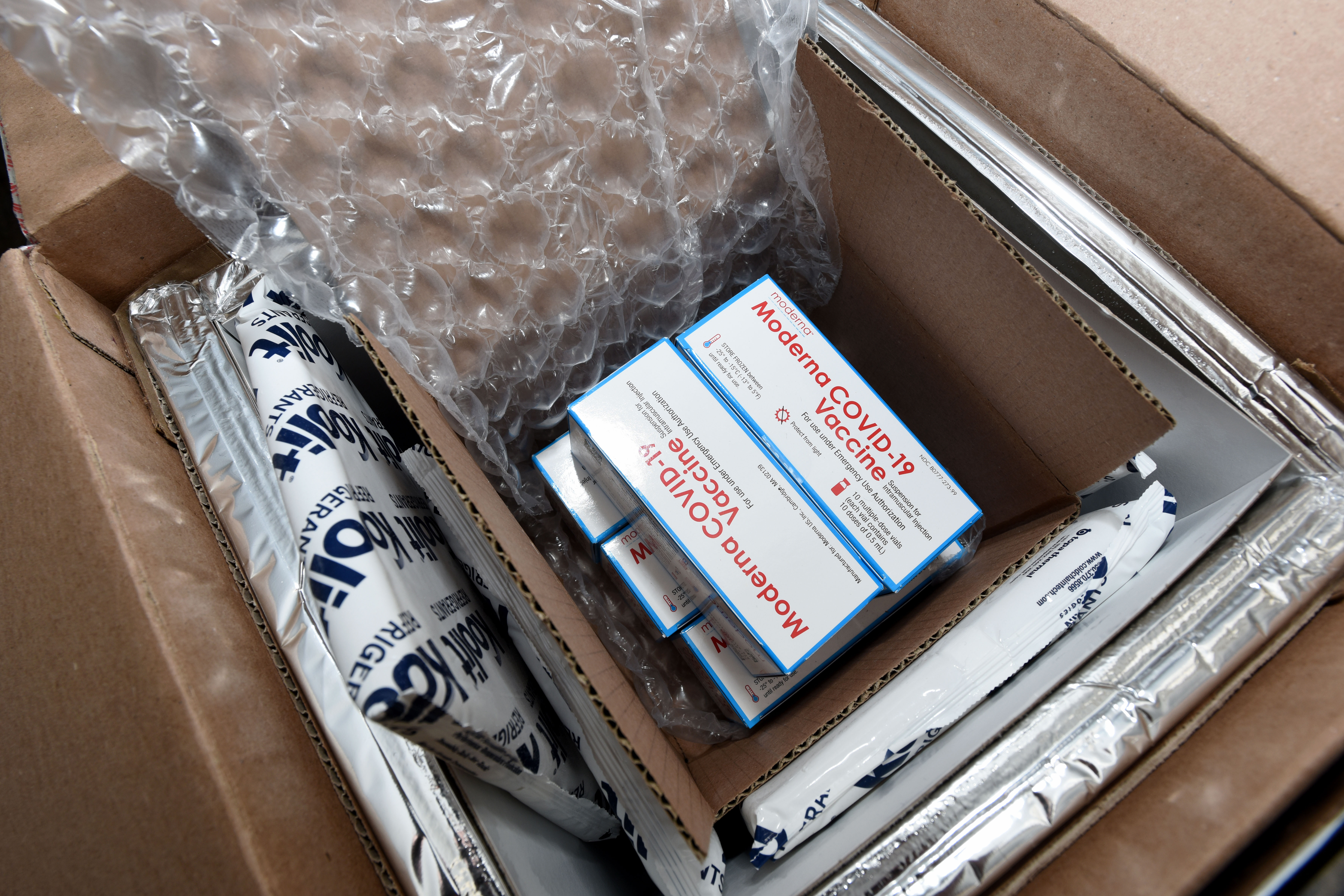
Moderna vaccine box packed with insulation and cold packs

External videos
- Loading dock operations at Pfizer's Portage, Michigan facility, 13 December 2020, C-SPAN
- President Joe Biden and Michigan Gov. Gretchen Whitmer tour the Portage, Michigan Pfizer facility with Pfizer CEO Albert Bourla, 19 February 2021, C-SPAN

Deploying a COVID‑19 vaccine may require worldwide transport and tracking of 10–19 billion vial doses, an effort readily becoming the largest supply chain challenge in history. As of September 2020, supply chain and logistics experts expressed concern that international and national networks for distributing a licensed vaccine were not ready for the volume and urgency, due mainly to deterioration of resources during 2020 pandemic lockdowns and downsizing that degraded supply capabilities. Globally, supplies critical to vaccine research and development are increasingly scarce due to international competition or national sequestration.

Addressing the worldwide challenge faced by coordinating numerous organizations – the COVAX partnership, global pharmaceutical companies, contract vaccine manufacturers, inter- and intranational transport, vaccine storage facilities, and health organizations in individual countries – Seth Berkley, chief executive of GAVI, stated: "Delivering billions of doses of vaccine to the entire world efficiently will involve hugely complex logistical and programmatic obstacles all the way along the supply chain."

As an example highlighting the immensity of the challenge, the International Air Transport Association stated that 8,000 Boeing 747 cargo planes, equipped for precision vaccine cold storage, would be needed to transport one dose for the entire population in the more than 200 countries experiencing the COVID‑19 pandemic. GAVI states that "with a fast-moving pandemic, no one is safe, unless everyone is safe."

In contrast to the multibillion-dollar investment in vaccine technologies and early-stage clinical research, the post-licensing supply chain for a vaccine has not received the same planning, coordination, security or investment. A major concern is that resources for vaccine distribution in low- to middle-income countries, particularly for vaccinating children, are inadequate or non-existent, but could be improved with cost efficiencies if procurement and distribution were centralized regionally or nationally. In September, the COVAX partnership included 172 countries coordinating plans to optimize the supply chain for a COVID‑19 vaccine, and the United Nations Children's Fund joined with COVAX to prepare the financing and supply chain for vaccinations of children in 92 developing countries. As of 2023, more than 1.6 billion COVAX doses have been provided to poor nations, assisting in the vaccination of 52% of their population, compared to a global average of 64%.

=== Logistics ===
Logistics vaccination services assure necessary equipment, staff, and supply of licensed vaccines across international borders. Central logistics include vaccine handling and monitoring, cold chain management, and safety of distribution within the vaccination network. The purpose of the COVAX facility is to centralize and equitably administer logistics resources among participating countries, merging manufacturing, transport, and overall supply chain infrastructure. Included are logistics tools for vaccine forecasting and needs estimation, in-country vaccine management, potential for wastage, and stock management.

Other logistics factors conducted internationally during distribution of a COVID‑19 vaccine may include:

- visibility and traceability by barcodes for each vaccine vial
- sharing of supplier audits
- sharing of chain of custody for a vaccine vial from manufacturer to the individual being vaccinated
- use of vaccine temperature monitoring tools
- temperature stability testing and assurance
- new packaging and delivery technologies
- stockpiling
- coordination of supplies within each country (personal protective equipment, diluent, syringes, needles, rubber stoppers, refrigeration fuel or power sources, waste-handling, among others)
- communications technology
- environmental impacts in each country

A logistics shortage in any one step may derail the whole supply chain, according to one vaccine developer. If the vaccine supply chain fails, the economic and human costs of the pandemic may be extended for years.

=== Manufacturing capacity ===
COVID-19 vaccine production by country
| Country | Doses (millions) | |
| Country | 3 Mar 2021 | 31 Jan 2022 |
|---|---|---|
| China | 141.6 | 4951.4 |
| European Union | 81.0 | 2459.9 |
| India | 42.4 | 1807.8 |
| United States | 103.0 | 1127.2 |
| Switzerland | 5.5 | 428.3 |
| Russia | 10.5 | 285.4 |
| South Korea | 1.6 | 148.9 |
| Argentina | - | 123.5 |
| Thailand | - | 110.2 |
| United Kingdom | 12.2 | 95.5 |
| Cuba | - | 53.1 |
| Japan | - | 50.0 |
| Australia | - | 44.4 |
| Iran | - | 15.0 |
| Kazakhstan | - | 9.6 |
| Belarus | - | 2.5 |
| Taiwan | - | 2.2 |
| Total | - | 11715.3 |

COVID-19 vaccine production by manufacturer, 31 January 2022
| Manufacturer | Doses (millions) | | Country |
|---|---|---|---|
| Pfizer/BioNTech | 2647 | .0 | EU, USA |
| AstraZeneca | 2563 | .1 | India, EU, China, South Korea, UK, USA, Japan, Thailand, Australia, Argentina |
| Sinovac | 2466 | .1 | China |
| Sinopharm | 2274 | .2 | China |
| Moderna | 752 | .7 | USA, Switzerland |
| Janssen Pharmaceuticals | 321 | .6 | USA, EU |
| Gamaleya Research | 277 | .4 | Russia, Kazakhstan, Belarus, Serbia, Argentina |
| Bharat Biotech | 250 | .8 | India |
| Anhui Zhifei | 38 | .8 | China |
| CIGB | 34 | .1 | Cuba |
| CanSino | 20 | .9 | China |
| Finlay Institute | 19 | .0 | Cuba |
| Vector | 13 | .1 | Russia |
| Shifa Pharmed | 10 | .0 | Iran |
| Novavax | 9 | .2 | India |
| Chumakov Centre | 6 | .0 | Russia |
| Razi | 5 | .0 | Iran |
| Medigen | 2 | .2 | Taiwan |
| RIBSP | 1 | .1 | Kazakhstan |

By August 2020, when only a few vaccine candidates were in Phase III trials and were many months away from establishing safety and efficacy, numerous governments pre-ordered more than 2 billion doses at a cost of more than US$5 billion. Pre-orders from the British government for 2021 were for five vaccine doses per person, a number dispiriting to organizations like the WHO and GAVI which are promoting fair and equitable access worldwide, especially for developing countries. In September, CEPI was financially supporting basic and clinical research for nine vaccine candidates, with nine more in evaluation, under financing commitments to manufacture 2 billion doses of three licensed vaccines by the end of 2021. Before 2022, 7–10 billion COVID‑19 vaccine doses may be manufactured worldwide, but the sizable pre-orders by affluent countries – called "vaccine nationalism" – threaten vaccine availability for poorer nations.

The RNA vaccines from Moderna and Pfizer-BioNTech are unusually difficult to produce because they rely upon encapsulation of mRNA in lipid nanoparticles, a novel technology which has never been scaled up before for mass production. As of February 2021, this was thought to be the primary bottleneck in the manufacturing of such vaccines. In November 2021, Moderna CEO Stéphane Bancel claimed that the company had a backlog of tens of millions of doses of its vaccine destined for Africa because COVAX or individual governments could not take delivery. He cited delays with dose administration, a shortage of refrigerator space, and delays getting customs documents.

Vaccines must be handled and transported according to international regulations, be maintained at controlled temperatures that vary across vaccine technologies, and be used for immunization before deterioration in storage. The scale of the COVID‑19 vaccine supply chain is expected to be vast to ensure delivery worldwide to vulnerable populations. Priorities for preparing facilities for such distribution include temperature-controlled facilities and equipment, optimizing infrastructure, training immunization staff, and rigorous monitoring. RFID technologies are being implemented to track and authenticate a vaccine dose from the manufacturer along the entire supply chain to the vaccination.

In September 2020, Grand River Aseptic Manufacturing agreed with Johnson & Johnson to support the manufacture of its vaccine candidate, including technology transfer and fill and finish manufacturing. In October 2020, it was announced that the Moderna vaccine candidate will be manufactured in Visp, Switzerland by its partner Lonza Group, which plans to produce the first doses in December 2020. The newly built 2,000-square-metre facility will ramp up production to 300 million doses annually. The ingredient will be shipped frozen at −70 °C to Spain's Laboratorios Farmacéuticos Rovi SA for the final stage of manufacturing. Lonza's site in Portsmouth, New Hampshire, aimed to start making vaccine ingredients exclusively for the U.S. by November 2020. Compounding the concerns over massive pre-orders by wealthy countries, manufacturing capacity is also limited by the fact that most vaccines are patented by companies in those countries. India and South Africa proposed a waiver to the TRIPS Agreement which would remove exclusivity agreements as a barrier to setting up new facilities but the measure is being blocked by the G7.

=== Cold chain ===
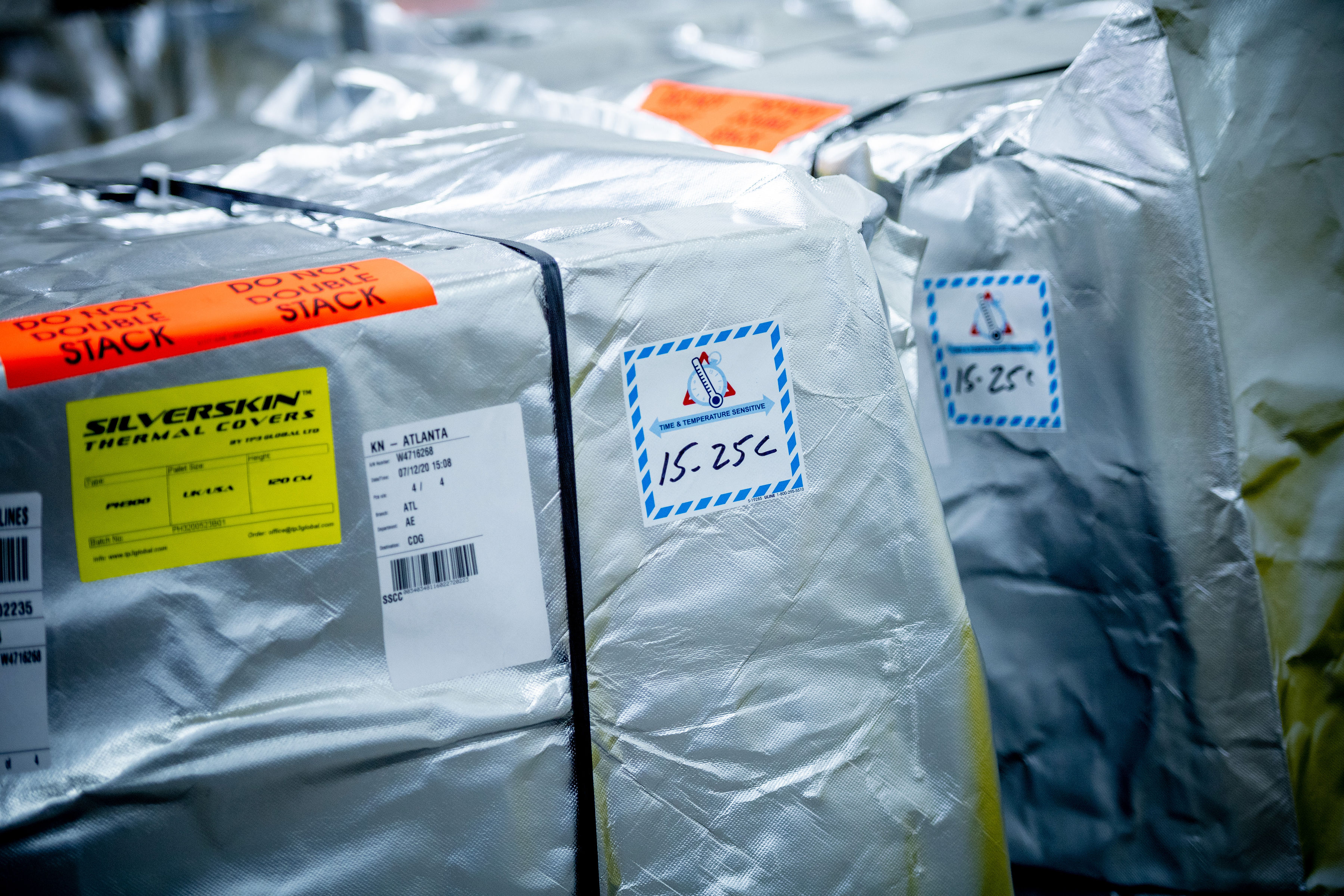
COVID‑19 vaccine shipment protected by thermal wrapping while in transit. (Delta, 16 December 2020)

Different vaccines have different shipping and handling requirements. For example, the Pfizer-BioNTech COVID‑19 vaccine must be shipped and stored between −80 and −60 °C (−112 and −76 °F), must be used within five days of thawing, and has a minimum order of 975 doses, making it unlikely to be rolled out in settings other than large, well-equipped hospitals. The Moderna vaccine vials require storage above −40 °C (−40 °F) and between −25 and −15 °C (−13 and 5 °F). Once refrigerated, the Moderna vaccine can be kept between 2 and 8 °C (36 and 46 °F) for up to 30 days.

Vaccines (and adjuvants) are inherently unstable during temperature changes, requiring cold chain management throughout the entire supply chain, typically at temperatures of 2–8 °C (36–46 °F). Because COVID‑19 vaccine technologies are varied among several novel technologies, there are new challenges for cold chain management, with some vaccines that are stable while frozen but liable to heat, while others should not be frozen at all, and some are stable across temperatures. Failure to maintain cold chain temperature stability results in damage that can reduce or even eliminate vaccine efficacy. Sinopharm and Sinovac's vaccines are examples of inactivated vaccines which can be transported using existing cold chain systems at 2–8 °C (36–46 °F).

modRNA vaccine technologies in development may be more difficult to manufacture at scale and control degradation, requiring ultracold storage and transport. As examples, Moderna's RNA vaccine candidate requires cold chain management just above freezing temperatures between 2 and 8 °C (36 and 46 °F) with limited storage duration (30 days), but the Pfizer-BioNTech RNA candidate requires storage between −80 and −60 °C (−112 and −76 °F), or colder throughout deployment until vaccination. In February 2021, Pfizer and BioNTech asked the U.S. Food and Drug Administration (FDA) to update the emergency use authorization (EUA) to permit the vaccine to be stored at between −25 and −15 °C (−13 and 5 °F) for up to two weeks before use. As of May 2021, Walvax is conducting Phase III trials for its mRNA vaccine which could be stored at room temperature for six months.

After a vaccine vial is punctured to administer a dose, it is viable for only six hours, then must be discarded, requiring attention to local management of cold storage and vaccination processes. Because the COVID‑19 vaccine will likely be in short supply for many locations during early deployment, vaccination staff will have to avoid spoilage and waste, which typically are as much as 30% of the supply. The cold chain is further challenged by the type of local transportation for the vaccines in rural communities, such as by motorcycle or delivery drone, need for booster doses, use of diluents, and access to vulnerable populations, such as healthcare staff, children and the elderly.

=== Air and land transport ===
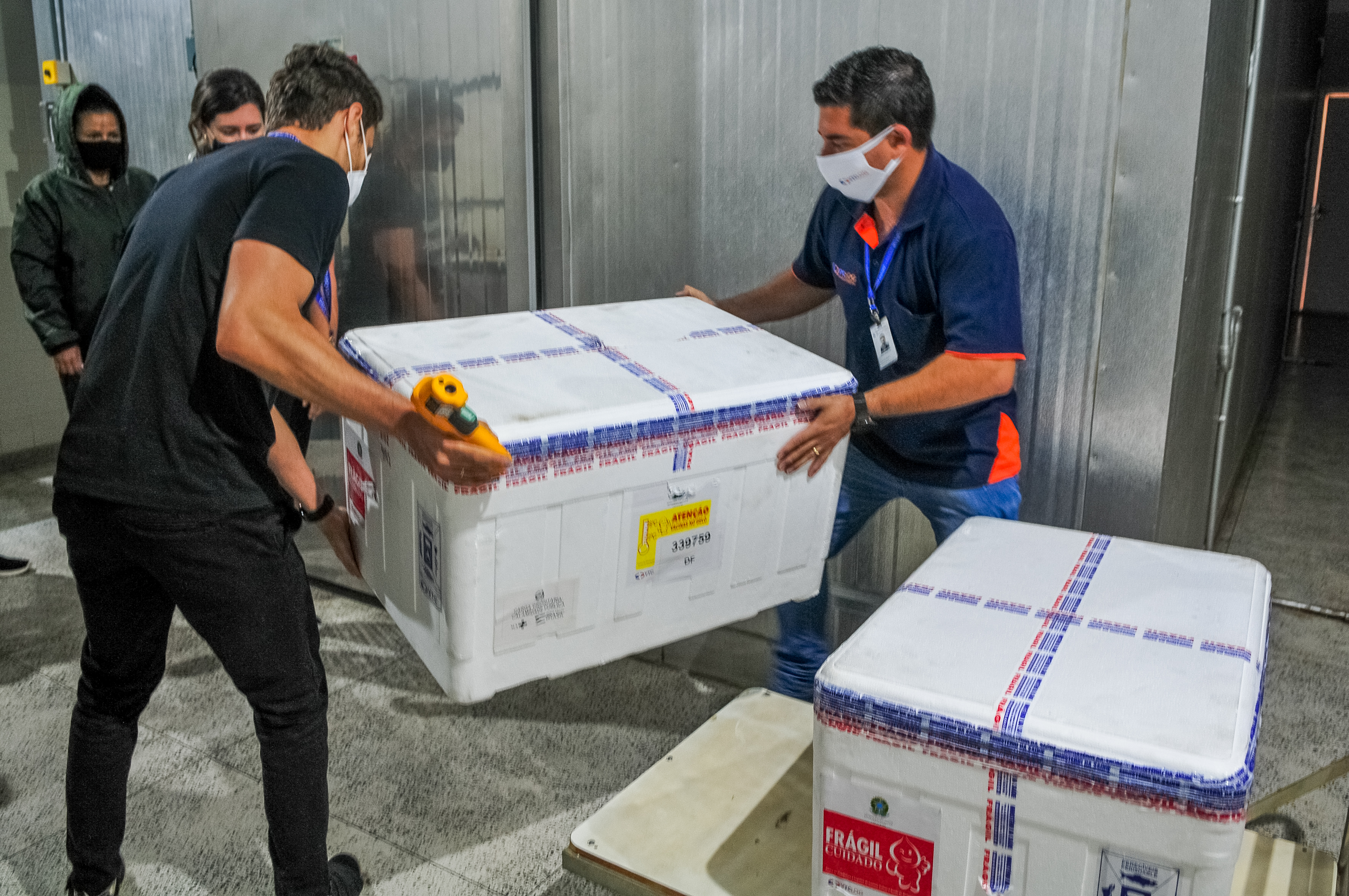
Boxes of AstraZeneca's COVID-19 vaccine from India are delivered in Brazil (January 2021).

Coordination of international air cargo is an essential component of time- and temperature-sensitive distribution of COVID‑19 vaccines, but, as of September 2020, the air freight network is not prepared for multinational deployment. "Safely delivering COVID‑19 vaccines will be the mission of the century for the global air cargo industry. But it won't happen without careful advance planning. And the time for that is now. We urge governments to take the lead in facilitating cooperation across the logistics chain so that the facilities, security arrangements and border processes are ready for the mammoth and complex task ahead," said IATA's Director General and CEO, Alexandre de Juniac, in September 2020.

For the severe reduction in passenger air traffic during 2020, airlines downsized personnel, trimmed destination networks, and put aircraft into long-term storage. As the lead agencies for procurement and supply of the COVID‑19 vaccine within the WHO COVAX facility, GAVI and UNICEF are preparing for the largest and fastest vaccine deployment ever, necessitating international air freight collaboration, customs and border control, and possibly as many as 8,000 cargo planes to deliver just one vaccine dose to multiple countries.

Two of the first approved vaccines, Pfizer and BioNTech's Pfizer-BioNTech COVID‑19 vaccine and Moderna's mRNA-1273, must be kept cold during transport. Keeping the temperatures sufficiently low is accomplished with specially designed containers (Note: With a steady supply of dry ice, the Pfizer-designed containers can insulate the vaccine for up to 30 days.) and dry ice, but dry ice is only allowed in limited quantities on airplanes as the gases released via sublimation may be toxic. In the United States, the Federal Aviation Administration (FAA) limits the amount of dry ice on a Boeing 777-224 to 3,000 lb (1,400 kg), but it temporarily allowed United Airlines to transport up to 15,000 lb (6,800 kg)—nearly 1 million doses—between Brussels and Chicago. The Centers for Disease Control and Prevention (CDC) tasked McKesson Corporation with vaccine distribution in the U.S.; the company handled all major vaccines except Pfizer's. American Airlines, Boeing, and Delta Air Lines are also working to increase dry ice transportation capacity, and American, Delta, and United each operate their own cold storage networks in the US. FedEx and UPS have installed ultra-cold freezers at air cargo hubs in Europe and North America, and UPS can manufacture 1,200 lb (540 kg) of dry ice per hour.

=== Security and corruption ===
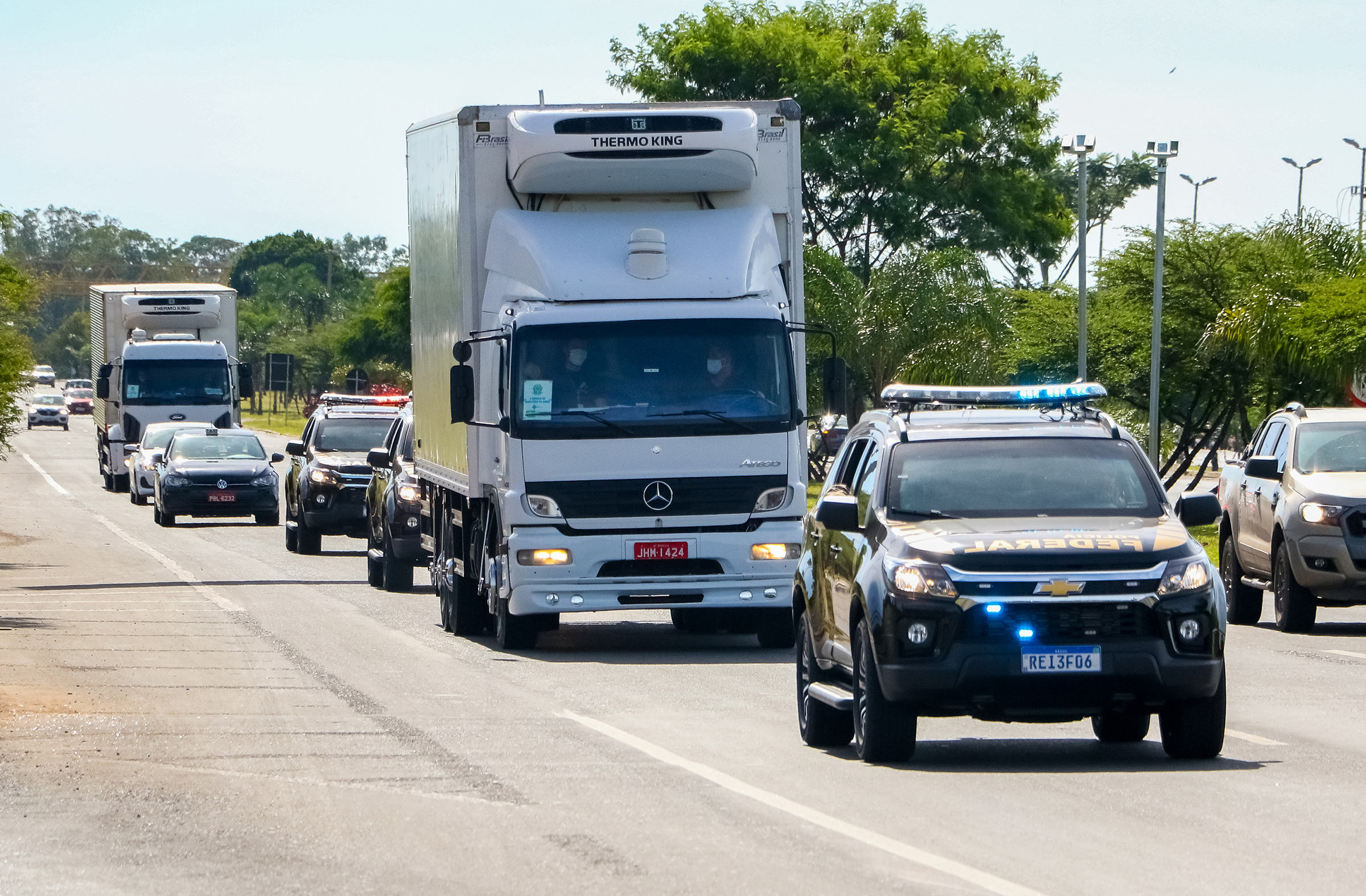
Federal police escort COVID-19 vaccine shipment in Brazil (January 2021).

Medicines are the world's largest fraud market, worth some $200 billion per year, making the widespread demand for a COVID‑19 vaccine vulnerable to counterfeit, theft, scams, and cyberattacks throughout the supply chain. The vaccine has been referred to as "the most valuable asset on earth"; Interpol called it "liquid gold" and warned of an "onslaught of all types of criminal activity". Anticorruption, transparency, and accountability safeguards are being established to reduce and eliminate corruption of COVID‑19 vaccine supplies. Absence of harmonized regulatory frameworks among countries, including low technical capacity, constrained access, and ineffective capability to identify and track genuine vs. counterfeit vaccines, may be life-threatening for vaccine recipients, and would potentially perpetuate the COVID‑19 pandemic. Tracking system technologies for packaging are being used by manufacturers to trace vaccine vials across the supply chain, and to use digital and biometric tools to assure security for vaccination teams. In December 2020, Interpol warned that organized crime could infiltrate the vaccine supply chain, steal product through physical means, and data theft, or even offer counterfeit vaccine kits. Further, vaccines which require constant freezing temperatures are also susceptible to sabotage.

GPS devices will be used in the United States to track the vaccines. In Colorado, the vaccine shipments will be escorted by Colorado State Patrol officers from Denver International Airport to the state's eight distribution points; the exact plans are confidential and law enforcement will "maintain a low-key profile".

Peripheral businesses may also be affected. An IBM security analyst told The New York Times that petrochemical companies are being targeted by hackers due to their central role in producing dry ice.

On 21 May 2020, the FDA made public the cease-and-desist notice it had sent to North Coast Biologics, a Seattle-based company that had been selling a purported "nCoV19 spike protein vaccine". On 21 January 2021, its founder, Johnny Stine, was arrested on a federal warrant charging him with introducing misbranded drugs into interstate commerce, a misdemeanor. Stine pleaded guilty in August 2021. On 8 March 2022, he was sentenced to five years' probation and ordered to pay $246,986 in restitution.

=== National infrastructure ===
The WHO has implemented an "Effective Vaccine Management" system, which includes constructing priorities to prepare national and subnational personnel and facilities for vaccine distribution, including:

- Trained staff to handle time- and temperature-sensitive vaccines
- Robust monitoring capabilities to ensure optimal vaccine storage and transport
- Temperature-controlled facilities and equipment
- Traceability
- Security

Border processes for efficient handling and customs clearance within individual countries may include:

- Facilitating flight and landing permits
- Exempting flight crews from quarantine requirements
- Facilitating flexible operations for efficient national deployment
- Granting arrival priority to maintain vaccine temperature requirements

== Tailored vaccination strategies ==
During a pandemic wave, rapid vaccination of those driving virus dissemination (the socially active) and vaccination of those at highest risk (the elderly, often socially less active) are two desirable goals that are at odds in the setting of limited vaccine supply. However, the recent study (published in 2022) on the national COVID-19 vaccination schedules in 29 countries (EU, UK, and Israel) shows that all researched schedules prioritized criteria referring to higher risk (being over 65 years old and/or having coexisting health conditions) over the criteria referring to virus dissemination (occupation and/or housing conditions). Postponing a second vaccine dose (the first is more important for avoiding a severe disease course) to allow faster access to the first dose for more persons has been chosen as deployment strategies in some countries. Using a reduced mRNA vaccine dose in the younger, who have a lower disease risk, a stronger immune response to the vaccination but are key drivers of pandemic waves, may allow reaching more persons faster, with vaccination strategy models predicting a significant reduction of nation-wide case load and deaths. On the other side, protection of some groups, e.g. the elderly or the immunosuppressed may require additional booster doses. Concerns regarding the impact of vaccination in pregnancy, compounded through miss information disseminated through numerous sources including social media platforms, led to poor uptake in this group, despite evidence COVID-19 vaccination has no detrimental impact on live birth or miscarriage.

== Liability ==
On 4 February 2020, US Secretary of Health and Human Services Alex Azar published a notice of declaration under the Public Readiness and Emergency Preparedness Act for medical countermeasures against COVID‑19, covering "any vaccine, used to treat, diagnose, cure, prevent, or mitigate COVID‑19, or the transmission of SARS-CoV-2 or a virus mutating therefrom", and stating that the declaration precludes "liability claims alleging negligence by a manufacturer in creating a vaccine, or negligence by a health care provider in prescribing the wrong dose, absent willful misconduct". The declaration is effective in the United States through 1 October 2024.

In the European Union, the COVID‑19 vaccines are licensed under a Conditional Marketing Authorisation which does not exempt manufacturers from civil and administrative liability claims. While the purchasing contracts with vaccine manufacturers remain secret, the manufacturers remain liable even for side-effects not known at the time of licensure.

Pfizer has been criticised for demanding far-reaching liability waivers and other guarantees from countries such as Argentina and Brazil, which go beyond what was expected from other countries such as the US (above).

== See also ==
Africa

- Algeria
- Angola
- Botswana
- Burkina Faso
- Cape Verde
- Democratic Republic of the Congo
- Egypt
- Ghana
- Morocco
- Nigeria
- Senegal
- South Africa
- Zimbabwe

Asia

- Bangladesh
- Bhutan
- China
- India
- Indonesia
- Iran
- Israel
- Japan
- Kazakhstan
- Malaysia
- Nepal
- Philippines
- Singapore
- South Korea
- Sri Lanka
- Taiwan
- Thailand
- Vietnam

Europe

- Albania
- Bosnia and Herzegovina
- Bulgaria
- Croatia
- Denmark
- France
- Germany
- Greece
- Hungary
- Iceland
- Ireland
- Italy
- Moldova
- Norway
- Portugal
- Romania
- Russia
- Spain
- Sweden
- Switzerland
- Turkey
- Ukraine
- United Kingdom

North America

- Canada
  - Quebec
- Haiti
- Mexico
- United States

Oceania

- Australia
- Fiji
- New Zealand

South America

- Argentina
- Brazil
- Colombia
- Peru
