= COVID-19 vaccination in Russia =

Plan to immunize against COVID-19

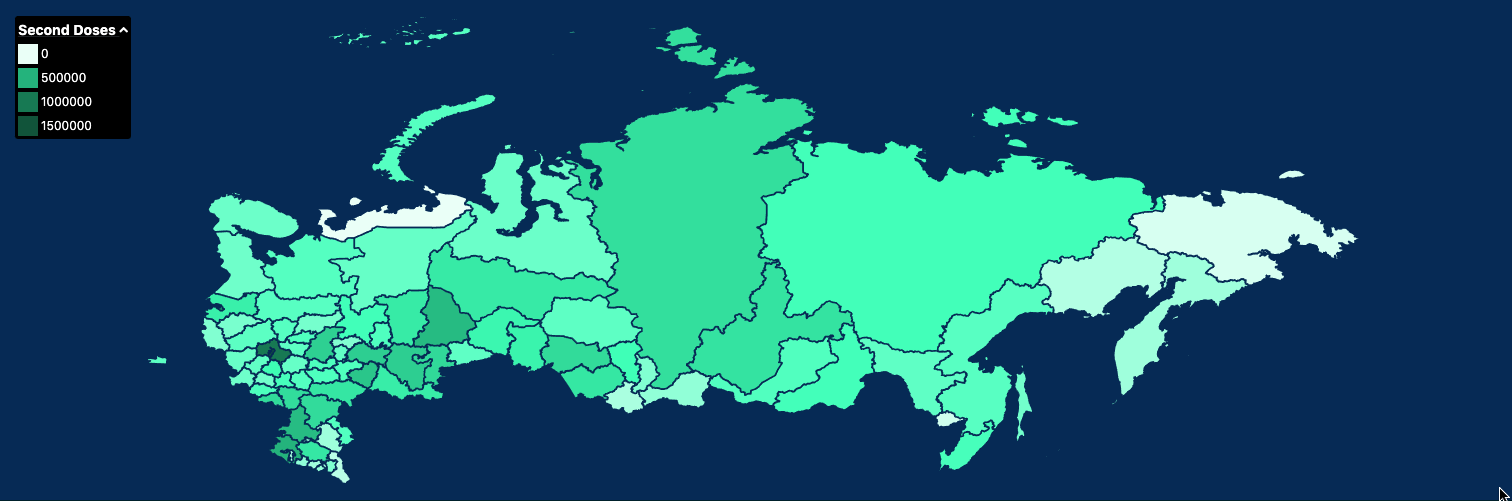
- Map of Russia by federal subject. Percentage of people fully vaccinated from the population as of 25 September 2021.
- Date: 5 December 2020 – present
- Location: Russia
- Cause: COVID-19 pandemic in Russia
- Target: Immunization against COVID-19
- Participants: 81,580,140 people have received at least one dose (21 June 2022); 74,311,072 people have been fully vaccinated (21 June 2022)
- Outcome: 55.86% of the Russian population has received at least one dose of a vaccine (Note: Including the disputed Crimea.); 50.88% of the Russian population has been fully vaccinated (Note: Including the disputed Crimea.)
- Website: Стопкоронавирус.рф

The COVID-19 vaccination campaign in Russia is an ongoing mass immunization campaign against severe acute respiratory syndrome coronavirus 2 (SARS-CoV-2), the virus that causes coronavirus disease 2019 (COVID-19), in response to the ongoing pandemic in the country. Russia became the first country to begin a mass COVID-19 vaccination programme on 5 December 2020, starting with primarily doctors, medical workers and teachers. In January 2021, this was extended to the entire population.

As of 21 June 2022, 81.5 million people have received at least one dose, with 79.7 million people fully vaccinated.

== Background ==
On 11 August 2020, President Putin said in a meeting that the Sputnik V vaccine (registered as Gam-COVID-Vac) developed by the Gamaleya Research Institute of Epidemiology and Microbiology was the first vaccine against the coronavirus to be registered. He said that one of his daughters was vaccinated. The previous day, the Association of Clinical Research Organisations, a union of pharmaceutical companies in Russia, urged the head of the Ministry of Health to delay the registration due to incomplete testing. The head of the Russian Direct Investment Fund (RDIF) stated that 20 countries had requested in total 1 billion doses of the vaccine, nicknamed Sputnik V. On August 20 registration was called "conditional" with final registration depends on results of Phase 3 trial, such registration is limited and allowed by Decree 441 for medicines in emergency situations.

On 8 September 2020, the health ministry's press service said that the first batches of the vaccine developed by the Gamaleya Centre had entered civilian circulation.

On 14 October 2020, President Vladimir Putin announced that the EpiVacCorona vaccine was approved. Registration is limited ("on conditions") and regulated by Decree 441 for emergency use.

On 20 February 2021, President Vladimir Putin announced that the CoviVac vaccine was approved. Registration is limited ("on conditions") too and regulated by Decree 441 for emergency situation.

On 6 May 2021, Sputnik Light vaccine was approved.

=== Vaccines on order ===
Vaccine	Emergency Use Approval	Deployment	Final Approval
Sputnik V	10 August 2020	27 November 2020	4 February 2022
EpiVacCorona	14 October 2020	18 January 2021	No
CoviVac	20 February 2021	25 March 2021	No
Sputnik Light	6 May 2021	Not yet	No

== History ==
=== December 2020 ===
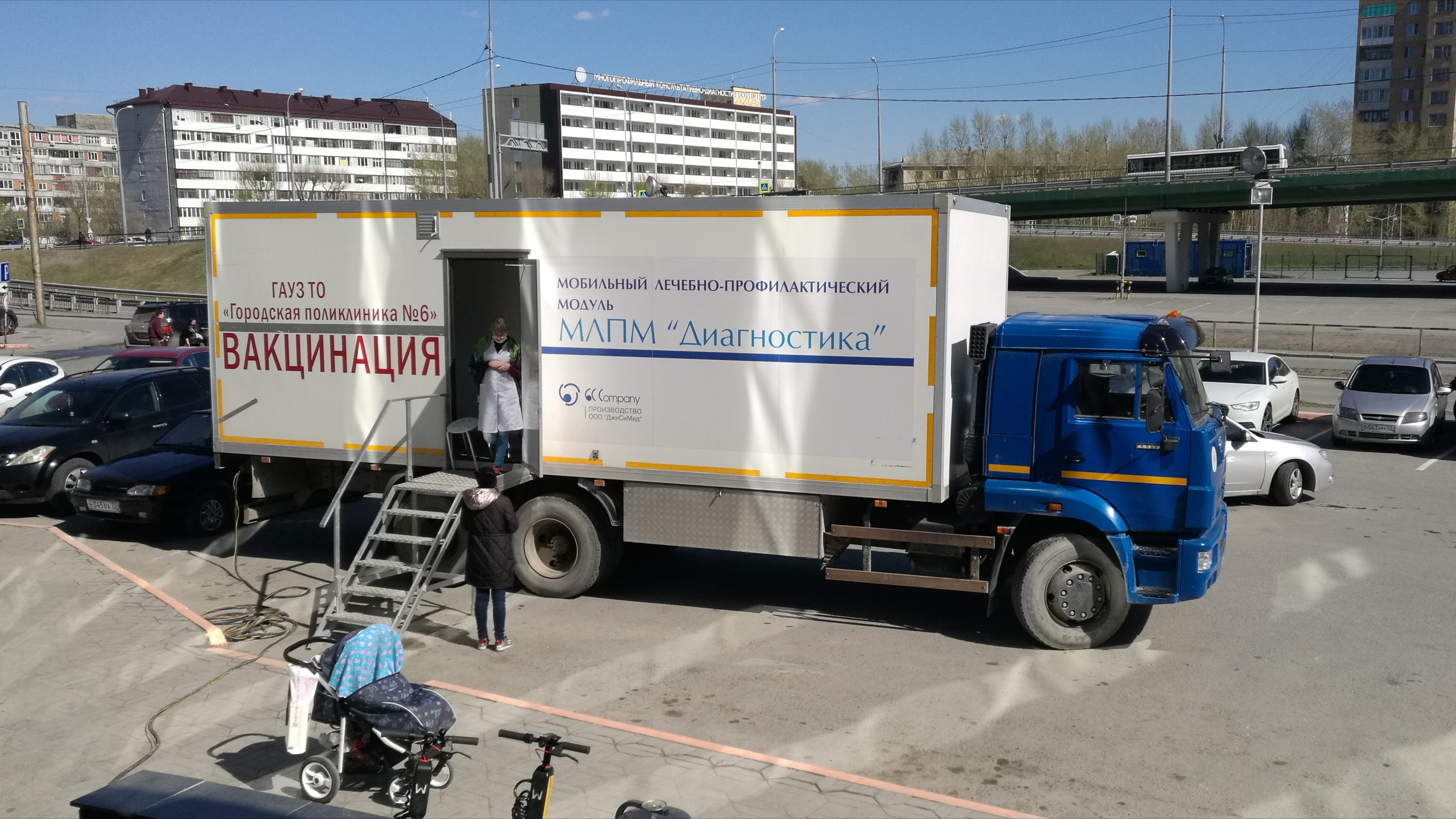
Mobile vaccination point near the shopping center. Tyumen, May 2021.

On 2 December 2020, President Putin ordered the start of mass vaccination of the population for the next week, starting with doctors, medical workers and teachers. On 5 December, vaccinations began in Moscow.

On 10 December 2020, Deputy Prime Minister Tatyana Golikova announced that approximately 6.9 million doses of the Sputnik V vaccine will enter civilian circulation in Russia before the end of February 2021. On December 15, the Ministry of Health announced the start of mass vaccination in all regions.

=== January 2021 ===
On 6 January 2021, the RDIF announced that 1 million people had been vaccinated with the Sputnik V vaccine. On January 10, 2021, the RDIF stated that over 1.5 million people had been vaccinated.

=== February 2021 ===
By 17 February 2021, 2.2 million people had received the first dose of the Sputnik V vaccine and another 1.7 million people had received both doses.

=== March 2021 ===
By 15 March 2021, over 3.5 million people had received both doses of the Sputnik V vaccine, according to the RDIF.

=== April 2021 ===
On 9 April 2021, Prime Minister Mikhail Mishustin said that less than half of those vaccinated were over the age of 60.

On 14 April 2021, Moscow Mayor Sergei Sobyanin said that around 820,000 Muscovites had been fully vaccinated, out of a population of 12 million. Sobyanin also said that Moscow was "fully supplied" with vaccines and urged Muscovites to get vaccinated. By 14 April, an estimated 9.5 million Russians had received at least one vaccine dose, with around 5.6 million having received both doses.

On 25 April 2021, Sobyanin announced that those over the age of 60 who get vaccinated would be eligible to receive a gift card worth 1,000 rubles to spend in shops, raised through contributions from businesses, in an effort to incentivize the vaccination campaign.

On 26 April 2021, 11.9 million people overall had received at least a first dose of a vaccine, representing 10% of the adult population.

=== May 2021 ===
On 21 May 2021, Mayor of Moscow Sobyanin decried low demand for vaccines, despite free and easy access to them since January. In a meeting, he said: "It's a shame that we have not had any restrictions on vaccinations for six months and we were the first in the world to launch a mass vaccination campaign... Unfortunately, we still have 9,000 Muscovites in hospitals with severe cases of coronavirus... People are still dying, yet don't want to get vaccinated". Sobyanin also stated that the percentage of people vaccinated in Moscow was less than in any other European city.

=== June 2021 ===
On 16 June 2021, Sobyanin announced that Moscow would introduce mandatory vaccinations for service workers in the city, following a surge in cases in the city. Business operating in service sectors would be required to have at least 60% of their workforce vaccinated with a first dose by 15 July, with both doses by 15 August.

On 22 June 2021, Sobyanin announced that, beginning 28 June, restaurants, bars and cafes in Moscow would be restricted to those who can show they have been vaccinated, had the virus confirmed within the last six months, or tested negative in the last three days. By 22 June, compulsory vaccinations were also decided in a number of other regions aside from Moscow and Moscow Oblast, including the city of St. Petersburg, the Sakha Republic, the Nenets Autonomous Okrug, the Leningrad, Tula, Kemerovo, Sakhalin and Tver oblasts, and Krasnodar Krai. Kremlin spokesman Dmitry Peskov also stated that discrimination against the unvaccinated was inevitable.

=== July 2021 ===
By 2 July 2021, compulsory vaccinations were introduced in a total of 24 federal subjects, with compulsory vaccinations planned to be introduced in Crimea and Murmansk Oblast.

== Public opinion ==
Public scepticism of being vaccinated remains high. A poll by the Levada Center released on 1 March 2021 found that 62% of Russian respondents did not want to receive the country's Sputnik V vaccine, with younger respondents being more reluctant. Another poll by the Levada Center released on 12 May found that 62% of Russian respondents were not ready to get vaccinated with Sputnik V, with 75% of respondents aged 18–24 years old not ready compared to 47% for those over 55 years of age. A survey by the SuperJob.ru job portal published on 16 May found that 42% of Russian respondents would not get vaccinated under any circumstances. Public scepticism continues to exist despite Russian and Western sources detailing the positive efficacy of the vaccine. A study in 2017 indicated that anti-vaccine views had been present in Russia prior to the pandemic, which only increased after the pandemic emerged.

== See also ==
- Deployment of COVID-19 vaccines
