= COVID-19 vaccination in Switzerland =

Plan to immunize against COVID-19

- Date: December 23, 2020 – present
- Location: Switzerland
- Cause: COVID-19 pandemic in Switzerland

COVID-19 vaccination in Switzerland is an ongoing immunization campaign against severe acute respiratory syndrome coronavirus 2 (SARS-CoV-2), the virus that causes coronavirus disease 2019 (COVID-19), in response to the ongoing pandemic in the country.

By 14 November 2023, 17,015,053 doses of COVID-19 vaccine have been administered.

== Background ==
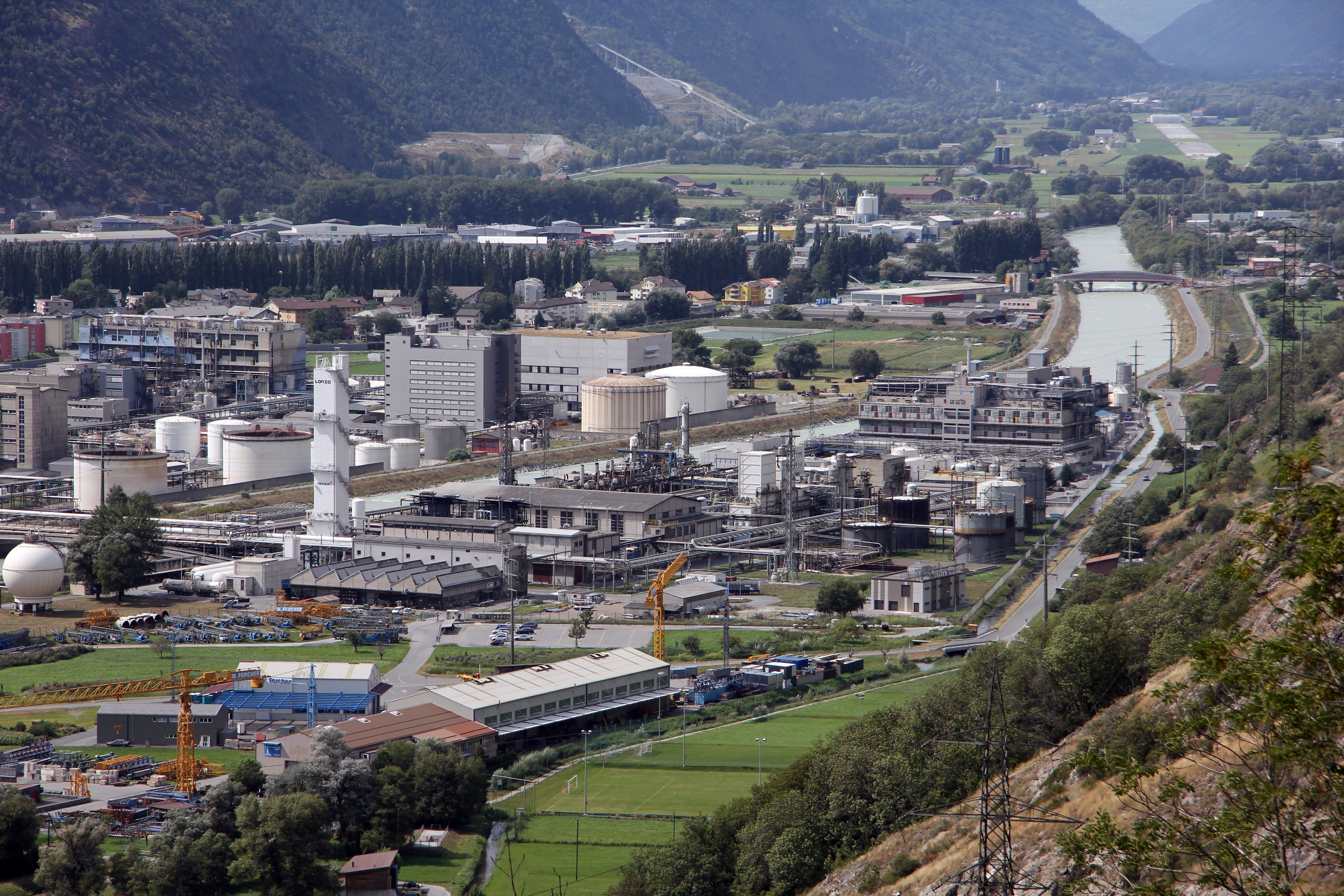
Lonza Group in Visp where the Moderna COVID-19 vaccine is produced.

On 19 December 2020, the Swiss Agency for Therapeutic Products (Swissmedic) approved the Pfizer–BioNTech COVID-19 vaccine (Comirnaty) for regular use, two months after receiving the application, although it was expected to give a decision later than other European countries, as Swiss laws do not allow emergency approvals. After the application was processed with high priority using all the available resources, the head of Swissmedic stated that the vaccine fully complied with the requirements of safety, efficacy, and quality. This constituted the first authorization by a stringent regulatory authority under a standard procedure for any COVID-19 vaccine. Three days later, 107 000 vaccine shots were received by the army to be dispatched in the cantons. On 23 December, 302 days after the first official case, the first patient, a 90-year-old woman from Central Switzerland, was vaccinated in a retirement home in Lucerne. On that day, the cantons of Lucerne, Zug, Schwyz, Nidwalden and Appenzell Innerrhoden launched the vaccination campaign, marking the beginning of mass vaccination in Switzerland and continental Europe outside Russia. Most cantons followed by 4 January 2021 and all the rest of them by 11 January. By that day, about 0.5% of the population received the Pfizer–BioNTech COVID-19 vaccine.

On 12 January 2021, Swissmedic approved the second COVID-19 vaccine: the mRNA-1273 made by Moderna. The Lonza Group where the vaccine is produced was visited by Federal Councilor Alain Berset the previous day. Up to 800,000 vaccines per day are expected to be produced there. A year after the first COVID-19 outbreak, the number of vaccinated people largely outnumbered the official cases. On 7 March, about 10% of the population received at least one shot of the two approved vaccines (Pfizer and Moderna) and about 3% were fully vaccinated.

A third vaccine, the Oxford/AstraZeneca vaccine (AZD1222), which comprised 5.3 million of the doses ordered by Swiss authorities, was rejected for approval by the Swiss medical authority, SwissMedic, citing insufficient data.

In March 2021, the Swiss Federal Health Ministry reported that approved vaccine deliveries have increased steadily every month. Switzerland received 1.1 million doses of the Moderna and Pfizer vaccines in January and February 2021, and another 1 million vaccine doses in March, exceeding initial expectations. As of 14 November, there have been 6,123,678 people who have taken the first dose of coronavirus vaccine. The country plans to have its 8.6 million residents vaccinated by summer 2021.

In April 2021, there were reports that vaccine administration and production efforts at the Lonza Group plant in Visp have been hampered due to overly stringent immigration rules in Switzerland, reducing the influx of qualified biotech and healthcare workers, particularly with regard to non-EU/EFTA states. The Valais National Council urged the Swiss federal authorities to create exemptions from the current immigration rules for essential biotech industries.

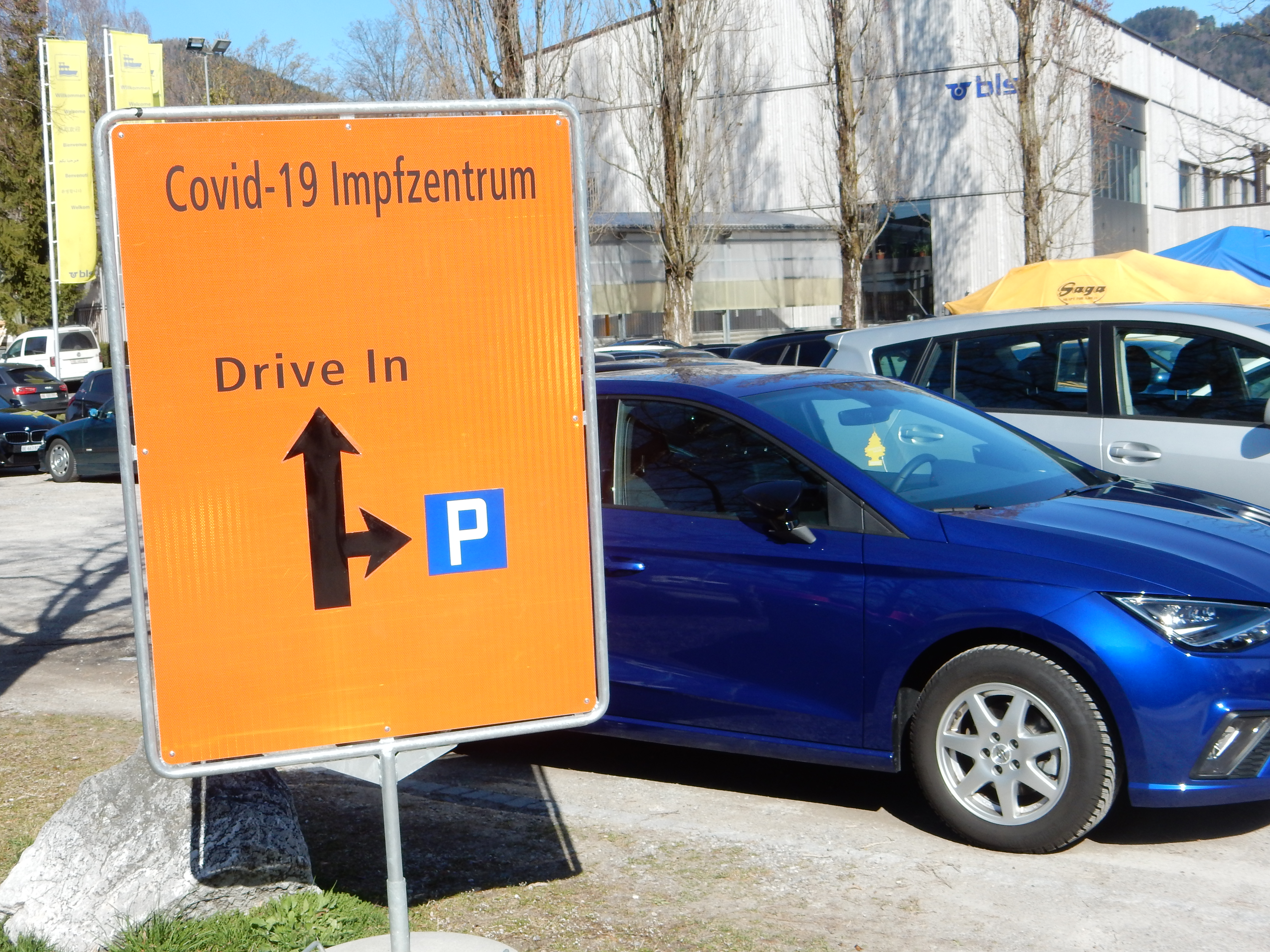
Drive In vaccination in Thun (March 2021)

=== Vaccines on order ===
Vaccine	Approval	Deployment
Pfizer–BioNTech	December 19, 2020	Yes
Moderna	January 12, 2021	Yes
Janssen	March 22, 2021	Yes
Novavax	April 13, 2022	Yes
