= Peter Bach =

Medical researcher

Peter B. Bach
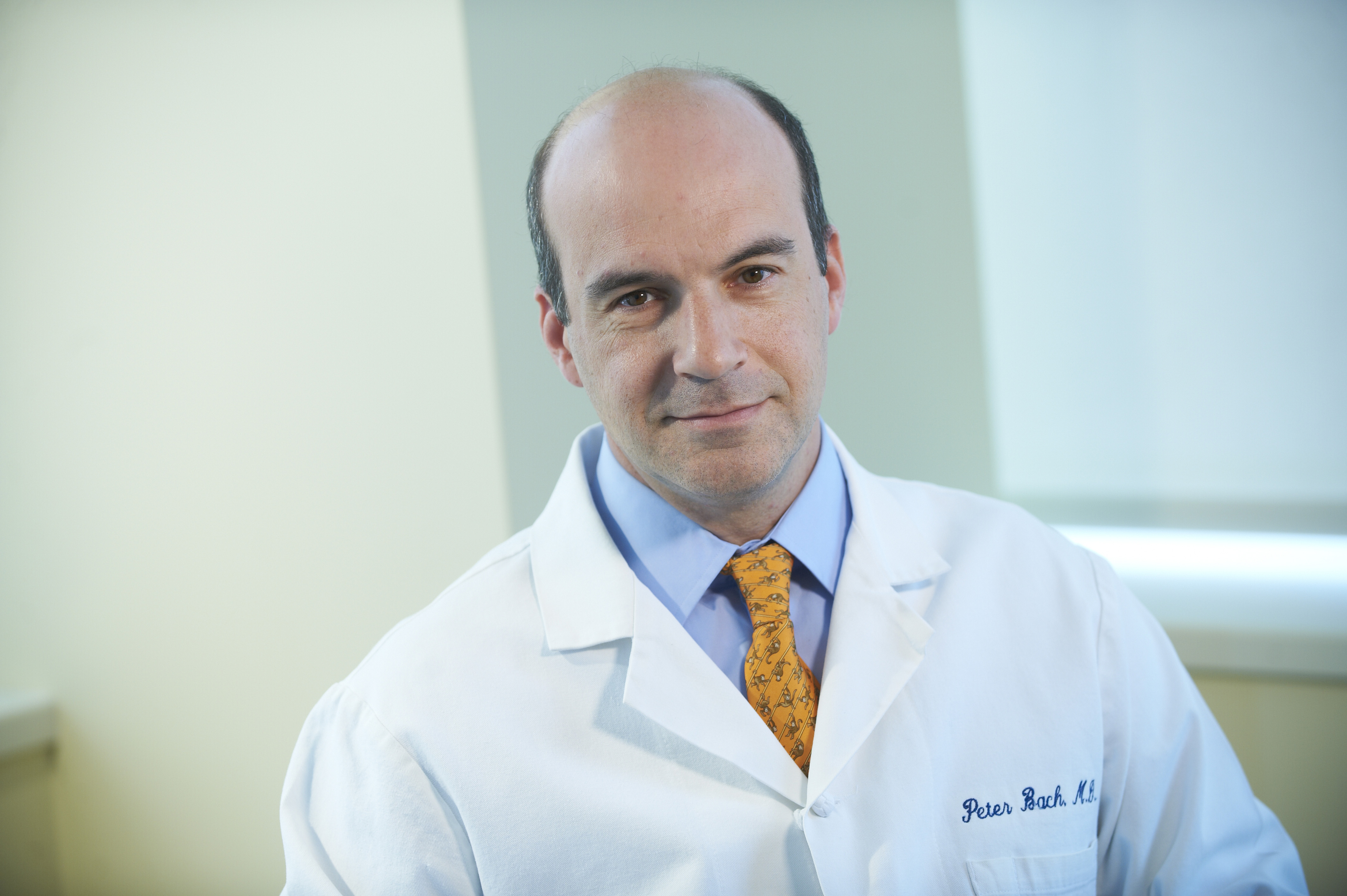
- Born: 1964 (age 61–62)
- Education: Harvard University; University of Minnesota; University of Chicago
- Spouse: Bianca Turetsky
- Medical career
- Profession: Physician, Health Policy Analyst, Writer
- Institutions: Memorial Sloan-Kettering Cancer Center
- Research: Healthcare Policy

Peter B. Bach is a physician and writer in Cambridge, MA. He is the chief medical officer of DELFI Diagnostics and was previously an attending physician and researcher at Memorial Sloan-Kettering Cancer Center where he was the Director of the Center for Health Policy and Outcomes. His research focuses on healthcare policy, particularly as it relates to Medicare, racial disparities in cancer care quality, and lung cancer. Along with his scientific writings, he is a frequent contributor to The New York Times and other newspapers.

== Education ==
Bach earned a bachelor's degree in English and American Literature from Harvard University (1986), an MD from the University of Minnesota (1992) and a Masters of Arts in Public Policy (1997) from the University of Chicago. He obtained his internal medicine training at Johns Hopkins Hospital, and completed a fellowship in Pulmonary and Critical Care Medicine at the University of Chicago and Johns Hopkins Hospital.

== Career ==
In 2021 Bach joined DELFI Diagnostics, a liquid biopsy cancer screening company, as its chief medical officer in 2021.

== Health policy achievements ==
=== Cancer drug prices ===
Beginning in 2009, Bach and his team published and reported on multiple technical attributes of the US pharmaceutical market that raised awareness and ultimately led to changes in how Medicare paid for drugs for its beneficiaries. The work in cluded, in 2009, the first comprehensive description of how Medicare paid for cancer drugs documenting inflationary policies published in the New England Journal of Medicine.Leading, in 2012, an opinion article describing why the hospital where he worked (Memorial Sloan-Kettering Cancer Center) was rejecting a drug [Zaltrap] due to its high price in 2012 - a move led the company to lower the drug's price, and to widespread coverage including a cover story in New York Magazine and a segment on "60 Minutes". Releasing the DrugAbacus, billed as an interactive tool that users can apply to model prices for cancer drugs based on a number of factors, including clinical efficacy, safety and toxicity, the value placed on a year of life, and the value of innovation in 2016. The tool demonstrated that there was no formula that could be used to 'solve' or explain current pricing for drugs.

=== Excess cost of wasted drugs ===
In 2016, Bach led a team that described how pharmaceutical companies were packaging drugs in oversized single use vials, thus earning billions in excess revenue on drug that was never used in the treatment of patients. The study led to an investigation by the HHS OIG, then to a pilot modification of billing codes for physician administered drugs then made permanent, a National Academy of Medicine report analyzing solutions to the problem, and a provision (Section 90004) of the Infrastructure Investment and Jobs Act (IIJA) that clawed back excess revenues earned from the practice. Avalere estimated that 2023 clawback alone for discarded drugs would equal $210Million.

=== Hepatitis C treatment 'Netflix' model ===
Bach and his colleague Mark Trusheim described an alternative payment approach for highly effective Hepatitis C treatments where states would pay a flat fee 'subscription' to the drug company in exchange for unlimited supply of treatment, a design focused on providing predictable revenue to the company and adequate supply to eliminate the disease. The approach was successfully implemented in Louisiana by Secretary Rebekah Gee, and has been proposed for national implementation.

=== Other areas ===
Bach has also worked on areas related to racial disparities within the provision of cancer care. Along with research collaborators, he has published evidence that black Medicare beneficiaries with lung cancer do not receive as high quality care as white patients. A paper in 2007 demonstrated that care in Medicare is highly fragmented, with the average beneficiary seeing multiple primary care physicians and specialists. He has worked on developing lung cancer screening guidelines also developed a lung cancer risk prediction model. He has proposed a number of strategies by which Medicare could link payment level to the value of healthcare delivered.

=== Other writings ===
His lay press contributions have included op-eds on topics such as medical school tuition funding, setting physician reimbursement based on market forces, and why cancer screening recommendations are often not followed.

== Personal life ==
Bach chronicled his wife Ruth’s treatment for early breast cancer in a series of articles of blog posts for the New York Times, and then wrote about her death in 2012 from the disease in a piece for New York Magazine. Bach discussed the article on Leonard Lopate's former show on WNYC. Bach married the writer Bianca Turetsky in 2021.

== Other positions ==
- The Centers for Medicare and Medicaid Services (Senior Advisor to the Administrator: 2005–2006)
- National Cancer Policy Forum of the Institute of Medicine (Member: 2005-current)
- Working group on HIT for the President’s Council of Advisors on Science and Technology (PCAST) (2009–2011)
- Institute of Medicine Committee on Geographic Variation in Healthcare Spending (Member: 2010-current)
- World Economic Forum's Global Agenda Council on Health Technology (2012-current)
