= COVID-19 vaccination in Iran =

Plan to immunize against COVID-19

Iran fully vaccinated almost 50 percent of the population by November 5th 2021, and permanently halted vaccine shot import. General population were to take the Sinopharm BIBP vaccine. From December 2021 electronic vaccine certificate were mandatory for work, mandatory service in Iranian Armed Forces, universities, and schools.

== Vaccination rates ==
Vaccination began late in Iran because Ali Khamenei, the supreme leader, banned the import and use of American and British vaccines. This decision stopped the import and use of Pfizer vaccines and during that period many Iranians died due to covid. Khamenei was heavily criticised for this. Research has stated that if vaccination was performed earlier, around 50–75 thousand fewer people would have died from COVID-19.

Iran broke its record of weekly vaccinations by opening 24-hour vaccination centres. Importing vaccine accelerated by changing the administration, but there is no evidence to demonstrate how much this rapidity of imports goes back to the mass production of vaccines, worldwide.

== Administrators ==
- National pandemic headquarters and Iranian Red Crescent Society
- Minister of health

== Program vaccines ==
- Bharat COVAXIN
- AstraZeneca
- Sputnik V (undelivered)
- COVIran Barekat (delivery unfulfilled)
- Sinopharm BIBP

=== Trial ===
- FAKHRAVAC
- Noora
