= COVID-19 vaccination in Hungary =

Plan to immunize against COVID-19

- Date: 27 December 2020 – present
- Location: Hungary
- Cause: COVID-19 pandemic in Hungary

COVID-19 vaccination in Hungary is an ongoing immunization campaign against severe acute respiratory syndrome coronavirus 2 (SARS-CoV-2), the virus that causes coronavirus disease 2019 (COVID-19), in response to the ongoing pandemic in the country.

== Vaccination program ==
Around 20.13% of the Hungarian citizens (based on the 2011 census and the official vaccination statistics) have received, at least, one anti-COVID-19 injection, since 28 March 2021.

== Background ==
Reports in March 2021 stated that Hungary was the first country in the EU to "begin using China's Sinopharm BIBP and Russia's Sputnik V vaccines, even as polling showed that public trust in non-EU approved vaccines was low". The European Commission's Vaccine Passport plan excluded the Sputnik and Sinopharm products because they were not "EU authorized vaccines". One suggestion to resolve that issue was that "Russian and Chinese vaccine producers submit their products to the EMA for testing and authorization". At the end of March 2021, Hungary also granted emergency use licenses to two more vaccines, CanSino (from China) and Covishield (the AstraZeneca vaccine produced by the Serum Institute of India).

=== Vaccines on order ===
Vaccine	Approval	Deployment
Oxford–AstraZeneca	Yes	Yes
Sinopharm BIBP	Yes	Yes
Pfizer–BioNTech	Yes	Yes
Moderna	Yes	Yes
Janssen	Yes	Yes
Sputnik V	Yes	Yes
Convidecia	Yes	No
Novavax	Yes	No
Sanofi–GSK	Pending	No
CureVac	Pending	No
Valneva	Pending	No

== Government response ==
On 17 March 2020, the Surgeon General announced that the National Safety Laboratory of National Health Security Center had successfully isolated COVID-19 from a Hungarian patient's sample, which it could use for the research and development of a new Hungarian vaccine. A consortium founded by the Department of Immunology at the Faculty of Sciences of Eötvös Loránd University, the Institute of Biology at the Science Faculty of the University of Pécs, Richter Gedeon and ImmunoGenes is involved in international biotechnological developments. Imre Kacskovics, leader of Immunology Department of ELTE, said the product currently in the first phase of development won't be a vaccine, but provide passive immunity. It will not prepare the body to fight against the virus. Some days after the successful isolation, the Bioinformatic Research Team of Szentágothay János Research Center at the University of Pécs and the university's virologists made the genome of the new SARS-CoV-2 human coronavirus available in Hungary.
