= COVID-19 vaccination in Spain =

Immunization plan against COVID-19 in Spain

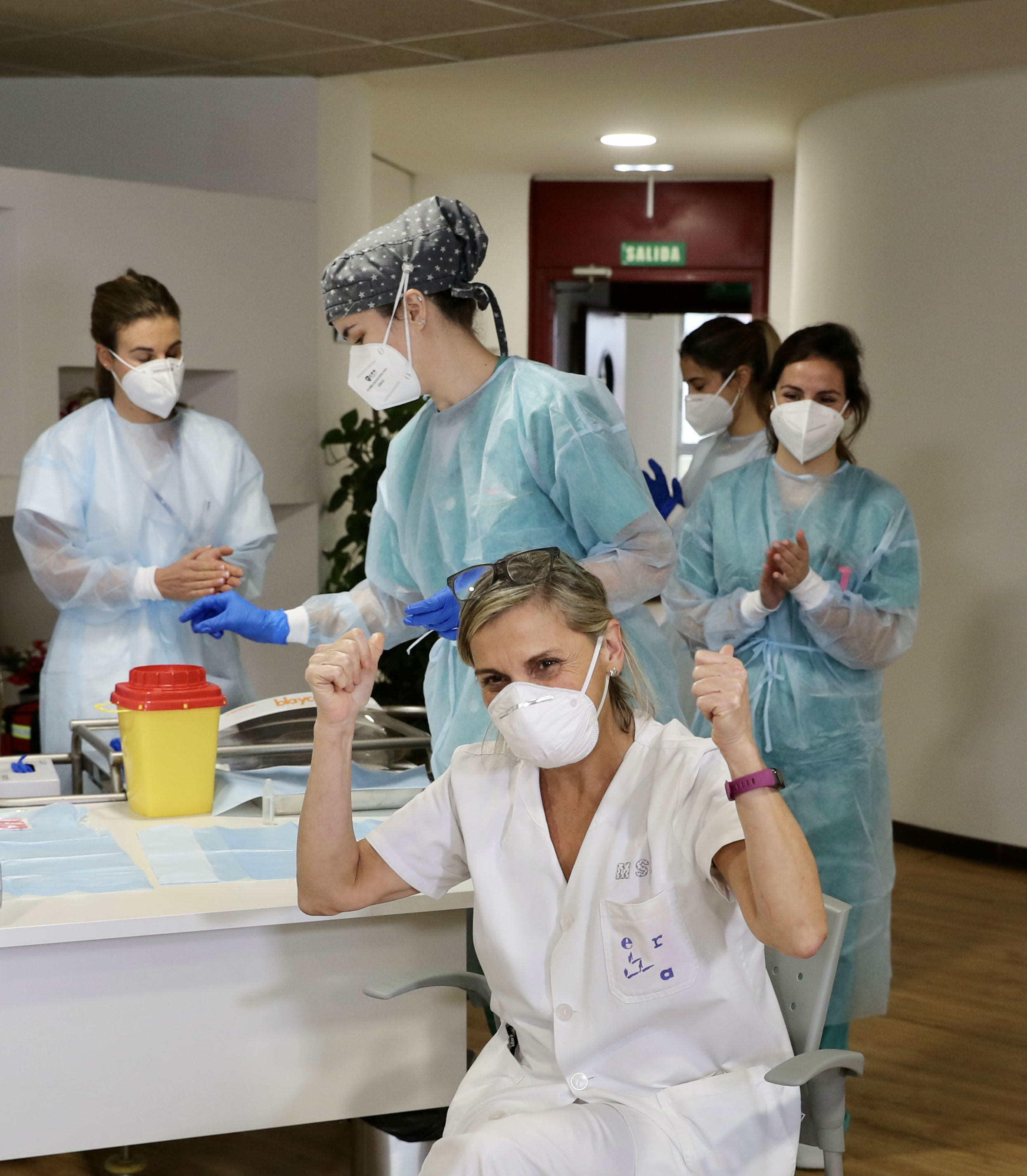
- Asturian residential home worker ready to get the COVID-19 vaccine
- Date: December 27, 2020 – present
- Duration: 5 years, 10 months and 1 day
- Location: Spain
- Cause: COVID-19 pandemic in Spain
- Target: Adult population (age 12+) and children (age 5+)
- Organised by: Ministry of Health
- Participants: 40.911.451 people
- Outcome: 86,2% partially vaccinated (1 of 2 doses); 80,7% fully vaccinated (46,2% with booster dose)
- Website: Gobierno de España
- Updated in January 31, 2022

COVID-19 vaccination in Spain is the national vaccination strategy started on 27 December 2020 in order to vaccinate the country's population against COVID-19 within the international effort to fight the COVID-19 pandemic.

As of 23 November 2021, the following doses had been received: 59,296,575 Pfizer–BioNTech COVID-19 vaccine doses, 16,105,300 Moderna vaccine doses, 17,427,500 Oxford–AstraZeneca vaccine doses and 2,659,000 Janssen vaccine doses, totaling to 95,488,375 doses. Out of these doses, 75,173,640 had been administered.

The autonomous communities with the highest fully-vaccinated percentage are Asturias (85.1%) and Galicia (84.9%), while the communities with the lowest percentage are the Canary Islands (75.7%) and the Balearic Islands (72.4%). The Spanish average percentage was 79.1%, amounting to 37,557,243 people.

Out of the total, 3,776,118 have been administered as additional doses, or third doses, of which 3,319,229 are Pfizer–BioNTech COVID-19 vaccine doses and 456,889 are Moderna vaccine doses.

The amount of doses ordered from Q1 to Q4 of 2021 is 141,943,261.

== Vaccines on order ==
There are several COVID-19 vaccines at various stages of development around the world.

Vaccine	Doses ordered	Approval	Deployment	Age Applied
Pfizer–BioNTech	146 million	21 December 2020	27 December 2020	12+
Moderna	52 million	6 January 2021	12 January 2021	12+
Oxford-AstraZeneca	31 million	29 January 2021	7 February 2021	60–69
Janssen	20 million	11 March 2021	5 May 2021	40+
Novavax	2,2 million	20 December 2021	Pending	Pending
Valneva	Pending	Pending	Pending	Pending
Sanofi–GSK	Pending	Pending	Pending	Pending
CureVac	Request withdrawn	Request withdrawn	No	No

== Phases and development of the vaccination campaign ==
According to the Government of Spain, the vaccination campaign, which is being carried out voluntarily, is structured in four phases. These phases are at the same time formed by different population groups defined in the National COVID-19 Vaccination Strategy :

Phases	Population group		Development (Note: When a group is classified as "completed", this is done based on the data reflected on the Sixth Edition of the National COVID-19 Vaccination Strategy and the Ministry of Health reports. Obviously, new incorporations to priority groups, as well as people who decide to change their initial position about receiving the vaccine, may not fulfill this classification.)	
Phases	Population group		1st doses	2nd doses (Note: When vaccinated, those who receive the Janssen vaccine, which requires just a single dose, are counted both in first and second doses.)
0	Development, approval and assessment.			
1	Priority groups	Elderly and disabled care homes' residents and staff	Completed (99,3%) (Note: Weekly updates are made available by the Ministry of Health about the vaccination index among those living in care homes (residents of elderly and disabled nursing homes). The difference between 100% and the current index is due to new residents, who are vaccinated when they move to these centres.)	Completed (92,0%)
1	Priority groups	First line health and socio-sanitary professionals	Completed	Completed
1	Priority groups	Other health and socio-sanitary professionals	Completed	Completed
1	Priority groups	Highly dependent people not living in care homes	Completed	Completed
2 (In progress)	Other priority groups	All those aged 80 and older	>100,0% (Note: The index is higher than 100%, since the census used for its computation is the most recent one prepared by the National Statistics Institute (INE), which may be a bit outdated, since it was elaborated in 2020.)	>100,0%
2 (In progress)	Other priority groups	All those aged between 70 and 79 and those with very high risk conditions	99,1% (Note: The vaccination index of this priority group is referred to those aged between 70 and 79 years old. It does not include those who have very high risk conditions for their health. However, the current National Strategy determines that their vaccination must be carried out at the same time for both groups, so it is expected that the vaccination index among those with risk conditions is quite similar or higher.)	98,2%
2 (In progress)	Other priority groups	All those aged between 60 and 69	97,9%	95,1%
2 (In progress)	Other priority groups	Other health and socio-sanitary professionals	Completed	Completed
2 (In progress)	Other priority groups	Workers with an essential social role	Completed	Completed
2 (In progress)	Other priority groups	All those aged between 50 and 59	97,4%	93,1%
3 (In progress)	Rest of priority groups	All those aged between 40 and 49	88,9%	85,6%
3 (In progress)	Rest of priority groups	All those aged between 30 and 39	74,4%	72,7%
3 (In progress)	Rest of priority groups	All those aged between 20 and 29	73,0%	70,0%
3 (In progress)	Rest of priority groups	All those aged between 12 and 19	80,7%	77,2%
TOTALS
Current prioritary goal (all those aged 40 and over)			94,2%	92,1%
Target population (all those aged 12 and over)			90,8%	85,5%
Spanish total population			79,5%	77,3%

Notes: The information shown in the table is collected up to September 1, 2021.

== Public opinion ==
=== Centre for Sociological Research ===
According to the Centre for Sociological Research, the Spanish public organism in charge of investigating the public opinion of the society on many different topics, these are the data of the acceptance of the vaccine among the Spanish population:

Question: "Would you be willing to get vaccinated immediately when the vaccine is available?"
		Oct 2020	Nov 2020	Dec 2020	Jan 2021	Feb 2021	Mar 2021	Apr 2021	May 2021	Jun 2021
YES	Yes	40,2%	36,8%	40,5%	72,5%	82,9%	82,5%	70,4%	53,2%	37,8%
YES	They are already vaccinated	–	–	–	–	–	5,1%	15,0%	37,7%	55,1%
YES	Yes, depending on the origin of the vaccine	0,2%	0,1%	0,6%	0,2%	0,4%	0,6%	2,4%	1,2%	0,4%
YES	Yes, if there are guarantees, if it is proven, if it is reliable	2,2%	1,4%	16,2%	2,5%	1,8%	0,9%	1,6%	0,5%	0,2%
YES	Yes, on the advice of the authorities, scientists or health professionals	0,2%	0,3%	3,6%	1,3%	0,9%	0,3%	0,4%	0,3%	0,1%
YES	Yes, if there is enough information	0,2%	0,0%	3,2%	0,8%	0,4%	0,2%	0,3%	0,2%	0,1%
YES	TOTAL YES	43,0%	38,6%	64,1%	77,3%	86,4%	89,6%	90,1%	93,1%	93,7%
NO	No	43,8%	47,0%	28,0%	16,5%	6,5%	5,4%	5,3%	3,7%	3,6%
NO	TOTAL NO	43,8%	47,0%	28,0%	16,5%	6,5%	5,4%	5,3%	3,7%	3,6%
NK + NA	Does not know, doubts	12,4%	13,4%	5,3%	4,5%	5,5%	3,8%	3,3%	2,4%	1,8%
NK + NA	Other answers	0,6%	0,7%	2,5%	1,7%	1,6%	1,0%	1,3%	0,7%	0,6%
NK + NA	N.A. (Not answers)	0,4%	0,3%	0,1%	0,1%	0,1%	0,0%	0,1%	0,0%	0,1%
NK + NA	TOTAL NK/NA (OTHER ANSWERS)	13,4%	14,4%	7,9%	6,3%	7,2%	4,8%	4,7%	3,1%	2,5%
Sample		2.924	3.853	3.817	3.852	3.869	3.820	3.823	3.814	3.814
Reference										

From February 2021 onwards, the centre began to ask among those who did not want to take the vaccine about the reasons they had for choosing not to receive the shot, obtaining the following results:

[ONLY AMONG THOSE WHO ARE NOT WILLING TO BE VACCINATED WHEN AVAILABLE FOR THEM]: "What is the main reason you have by which you would not take the vaccine when your turn comes?" (spontaneous answer)
	February 2021		March 2021		April 2021		May 2021		June 2021	
	% question	% total sample	% question	% total sample	% question	% total sample	% question	% total sample	% question	% total sample
They do not rely on these vaccines	31,2%	2,0280%	29,3%	1,5822%	34,6%	1,8338%	25,3%	0,9361%	35,4%	1,2744%
Because of fear to develop risks for their health/side-collateral effects	18,5%	1,2025%	20,1%	1,0854%	25,3%	1,3409%	25,3%	0,9361%	15,6%	0,5616%
They are against all vaccines in general	4,3%	0,2795%	1,7%	0,0981%	3,1%	0,1643%	4,4%	0,1628%	7,1%	0,2556%
They prefer to wait to see how they work	9,2%	0,5980%	6,0%	0,3240%	3,5%	0,1855%	7,7%	0,2849%	6,9%	0,2484%
They do not believe they are effective	8,3%	0,5395%	7,1%	0,3834%	5,2%	0,2756%	8,7%	0,3219%	5,2%	0,1872%
They do not consider it necessary (without specifying)	–	–	4,6%	0,2484%	3,7%	0,1961%	7,3%	0,2701%	4,7%	0,1692%
Because of lack of guarantees: few trials, earliness, lack of analysis	4,6%	0,2990%	4,6%	0,2484%	3,7%	0,1961%	4,2%	0,1554%	3,1%	0,1116%
COVID-19 denial	–	–	3,1%	0,1674%	2,8%	0,1484%	0,7%	0,0259%	3,1%	0,1116%
Because of having few possibilities of infection	3,2%	0,2080%	3,5%	0,1890%	1,0%	0,0530%	4,8%	0,1776%	3,0%	0,1080%
Because of having allergies, other diseases or treatments, breastfeeding, pregnancy	3,0%	0,1950%	2,1%	0,1134%	3,6%	0,1908%	3,7%	0,1369%	2,3%	0,0828%
Because of having passed COVID-19	–	–	4,6%	0,2484%	3,4%	0,1802%	0,2%	0,0074%	2,2%	0,0792%
Because of lack of information	1,5%	0,0975%	3,7%	0,1998%	1,1%	0,0583%	0,7%	0,0259%	1,4%	0,0504%
There are other people more vulnerable or with a higher risk than them	0,8%	0,052%	1,0%	0,0540%	–	–	–	–	0,8%	0,0288%
They do not ever get vaccinated	1,0%	0,0650%	1,5%	0,0810%	1,6%	0,0848%	1,5%	0,0555%	-	-
Because of any other reason	12,9%	0,8385%	4,9%	0,2646%	5,8%	0,3074%	3,1%	0,1147%	7,3%	0,2628%
They do not know, doubt	1,3%	0,0845%	1,9%	0,1026%	1,0%	0,0530%	1,8%	0,0666%	-	-
N.A. (Not answers)	0,2%	0,0130%	–	–	0,5%	0,0265%	0,8%	0,0296%	1,9%	0,0684%
Sample	251	3.869	208	3.820	203	3.823	143	3.814	138	3.814
Reference										

== Vaccinated Spanish public figures ==
The progress of the vaccination campaign to more and more demographic groups has allowed many public figures to receive one or two doses of the vaccine correspondent to them by age or belonging to some other priority group.

=== Politicians ===
==== State authorities ====
- King Philip VI of Spain received the vaccine on May 29, 2021, at 53 years old. The head of State received the vaccine without medical transcendence, and was only informed after receiving the jab. He was vaccinated once the access for his age group was opened, at the massive vaccination point set up in WiZink Center in Madrid, as any other citizen. He was accompanied by the head of the Royal Family medical service, Juan Martínez, and by the Vice-councillor for Public Health and COVID-19 Plan of the Community of Madrid, Antonio Zapatero. Regarding the vaccine brand, although it was not officially communicated, it is known that only Janssen vaccines were given that day. With respect to the published images, these were not distributed by the Royal Family, however, the TV programme Cuatro al día from the Spanish broadcasting station Cuatro published a picture of the head of State receiving the vaccine.

== Statistics ==
=== Progress to date ===
View source data.
