= COVID-19 vaccination in Sri Lanka =

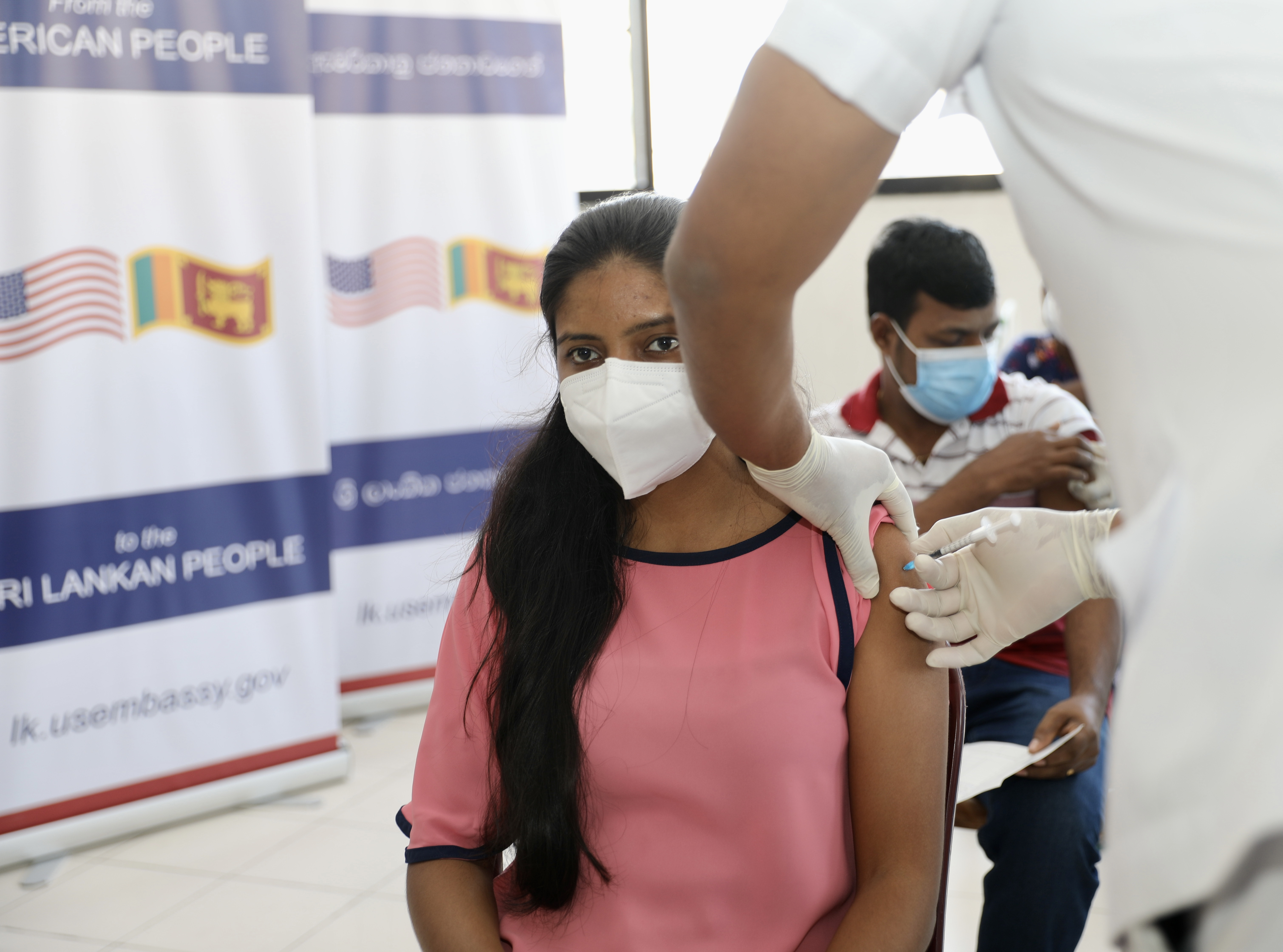
- A Sri Lankan woman is vaccinated in 2021 as part of the COVAX initiative
- Date: 29 January 2021 – present
- Location: Sri Lanka
- Cause: COVID-19 pandemic in Sri Lanka
- Organized by: Government of Sri Lanka
- Outcome: 56.4% of the Sri Lankan population has received at least one dose (as of 28 August 2021); 31.5% of Sri Lankan population has received both doses (as of 28 August 2021)

COVID-19 vaccination in Sri Lanka is an ongoing immunisation campaign against severe acute respiratory syndrome coronavirus 2 (SARS-CoV-2), the virus that causes COVID-19, in response to the ongoing pandemic in the country. As of late July, the Sinopharm BIBP vaccine accounted for 78% of the total 13.8 million vaccines obtained by Sri Lanka to date. The United States donated over 1.5 million Moderna vaccine through COVAX.

== Background ==
The Government of Sri Lanka commenced its COVID-19 vaccination program under the COVAX facility with first batch of Oxford–AstraZeneca vaccines arrive in Sri Lanka on 28 January 2021 from the Serum Institute of India. (SII).

=== Shortages ===
By April, with a surge in COVID cases in a third wave of infections, Sri Lanka faced a severe shortage of the Astra-Zeneca vaccine due to an export ban by India. This left majority of the 3.5% of the population that was given the first dose without access to the second. Sri Lanka faced an shortage of Sputnik V vaccine due to a spike of cases in Russia resulting in the manufacturer Gamaleya Research Institute of Epidemiology and Microbiology, focusing on meeting local demand.

=== Other vaccine supplies ===
In March 2021, the Sinopharm BIBP vaccine was approved emergency use. In May, the country ordered 14 million doses on top of 1.1 million doses previously donated. By July, Sri Lanka had received 10.7 million doses of the vaccine. In June, local studies in the country showed vaccination with the Sinopharm BIBP vaccine generated seroconversion and antibody responses in individuals to Delta and Beta variants similar to antibody levels seen following a natural infection

=== Phase three ===
With vaccination of persons above 30 years reaching completion, vaccination of those between 18 and 30 years who did not fall under special categories were started in early September 2021.

== Proposed vaccine production ==
On 27 May State Minister for Pharmaceuticals Channa Jayasumana told reporters Sri Lanka was considering co-production of CoronaVac. It was not clarified if it would handle full production or a fill and finish plant.

== Vaccination programme ==
=== Vaccines used ===
Currently, the vaccines approved by government of Sri Lanka for emergency use are:

Vaccine	Approval	Deployment
Oxford–AstraZeneca	Yes	Yes
Sinopharm BIBP	Yes	Yes
Sputnik V	Yes	Yes
Pfizer–BioNTech	Yes	Yes
Moderna	Yes	Yes
Sinovac	Yes	No

== Vaccine distribution ==
Vaccine types were deployed on a geographical and group basis:

Special groups

- Medical professionals and front line workers: Oxford–AstraZeneca
- Students travelling overseas for studies: Pfizer–BioNTech
- Migrant workers travelling overseas for work: Pfizer–BioNTech
- Fishermen in Mannar: Pfizer–BioNTech

Geographical

- Western province: Oxford–AstraZeneca, Sinopharm BIBP
- Central province: Sputnik V, Moderna
- Southern province: Oxford–AstraZeneca, Sinopharm BIBP
- North Western province: Oxford–AstraZeneca, Sinopharm BIBP
- Northern province: Sinopharm BIBP
- Eastern province: Sinopharm BIBP
- Sabaragamuwa province: Sinopharm BIBP
- Uva province: Sinopharm BIBP
- North central province: Sinopharm BIBP

== Vaccine on order ==
Vaccine	Type (technology)	Doses ordered	Manufacturer	Remarks
Oxford–AstraZeneca	Viral vector	8,400,000	(India) Serum Institute	-
Sputnik V	Viral vector	13,000,000	(Russia) R-Pharm	-
Pfizer–BioNTech	RNA	14,900,000	(United States) Pfizer	-
Sinopharm BIBP	Inactivated virus	23,000,000	(China) Sinopharm	-
