= Military Medical Academy =

Military Medical Academy may refer to:

- Military Medical Academy (Bulgaria), in Sofia
- Military Medical Academy (Serbia), in Belgrade
- Gülhane Military Medical Academy, in Ankara
- S. M. Kirov Military Medical Academy, in St. Petersburg
