= COVID-19 pandemic in Bulgaria =

Ongoing COVID-19 viral pandemic in Bulgaria

- Disease: COVID-19
- Pathogen: SARS-CoV-2
- Location: Bulgaria
- First outbreak: Wuhan, Hubei, China (globally)
- Index case: Pleven, Gabrovo
- Arrival date: 8 March 2020 (6 years, 7 months, 1 week and 3 days ago)
- Confirmed cases: 1,101,326
- Active cases: 211,246
- Hospitalized cases: 3,172
- Critical cases: 413
- Recovered: 854,248
- Deaths: 35,832
- Fatality rate: 3.25%

Government website
- Coronavirus.bg

The COVID-19 pandemic in Bulgaria was a part of the worldwide pandemic of coronavirus disease 2019 (COVID-19) caused by severe acute respiratory syndrome coronavirus 2 (SARS-CoV-2). The virus was confirmed to have spread to Bulgaria when the country's first cases, a 27-year-old man from Pleven and a 75-year-old woman from Gabrovo, were confirmed on 8 March 2020. Neither of the two had traveled to areas with known coronavirus cases. The man tested positive for the virus after being hospitalized for a respiratory infection, and authorities announced plans to test several people who were in contact with the two individuals. Two other samples in Pleven and Gabrovo were positive on 8 March. Patient zero remains unknown.

After the number of patients in the country had reached 23, the Bulgarian Parliament voted unanimously to declare a state of emergency from 13 March until 13 April. A 14-day preventive house quarantine was introduced for citizens who had been in contact with a COVID-19 patient or had returned from an overseas region with a high number of cases. For patients tested positive for the virus, a 21-day house quarantine was introduced. This time span was counted from the day a subsequent test came out negative after they had been treated in a hospital or at home. After the World Health Organization (WHO) had established that COVID-19 was more resilient than the initial data was showing, the National Crisis-management Staff increased the recovery house quarantine by a week to 28 days. With the continuing increase of COVID-19 cases on a daily basis, the Bulgarian government requested on 1 April that Parliament extend the state of emergency by one month until 13 May.

As of 5 February 2023, a total of 4,612,386 vaccine doses have been administered.

== Background ==
A National Crisis-management Staff was formed by the Bulgarian government on 5 March to deal with the coronavirus pandemic. The government appointed Major general Vencislav Mutafchiyski as the chairman of the Staff. Mutafchiyski was the director of the Military Medical Academy and the most senior medical officer of the Bulgarian Armed Forces. He is an abdomen (stomach) surgeon and epidemiology is not among his specialties. The MMA combines the military medical services of the country in their entirety with several hospitals in the capital Sofia and around the country. At the same time it is one of the country's leading medical institutions and possesses large medical treatment capacity and know-how. The Staff fulfilled a direct operational role in the management of the crisis and its decisions were implemented through executive orders of Bulgaria's Prime Minister and the country's Minister of Health.

On 23 March a separate Medical Council for dealing with the coronavirus pandemic was appointed by the Prime Minister. The council was chaired by Kosta Kostov, a leading pulmonary disease expert. The council's mission was to provide the government with complementary analysis and action proposals and the general public with professional guidance and information. Unlike the National Crisis-management Staff, which was a formal national institution with executive power and tasks, the council had mostly a knowledge-based advisory role. On 4 April the Medical Council dispersed, having achieved its purpose, according to its chairman.

== Timeline ==
=== February ===
Limited border health monitoring was introduced in February 2020.

=== March ===
==== 8 March ====
On 8 March 2020, Bulgaria confirmed its first two cases, a 27-year-old man from Pleven and a 75-year-old woman from Gabrovo. Neither of the two reported having traveled to areas with known coronavirus cases. The man tested positive for the virus after being hospitalized for a respiratory infection, and authorities announced plans to test several people who were in contact with the two individuals. Two other samples in Pleven and Gabrovo were found positive on 8 March. Patient zero remains unknown.

On the same day, the hospital in Gabrovo requested additional personnel from other hospitals in the country, as it only had three communicable diseases specialists. All of its internal medicine specialists have been quarantined after one of the four initial cases was confirmed to be a nurse at the hospital. The government issued a nationwide ban on closed-door public events. The origin of the outbreak remains unknown, and the Ministry of Interior is tracking down all individuals who have been in contact with the patients. As of 8 March 254 suspected cases were under quarantine across the country.

==== 10 March ====
Detected active cases (blue), hospitalized patients, incl. ICU (red), patients in ICU (yellow) and daily death cases (black). The horizontal dashed red and yellow lines are the beds reserved for CoViD-19 patients in October 2020. The graphs are smoothed by central moving average and plotted in semi-logarithmic scale.

Two additional cases were confirmed in Sofia on 10 March 2020: a 74-year-old man and his 66-year-old wife. Both have arrived from Lom two weeks prior to admission. The woman died on the next day, becoming the first COVID-19 death in the country.

==== 11 March ====
A suspected case of a 33-year-old man was reported by the Saint George Hospital in Plovdiv on 11 March. The same day, a 40-year-old woman in Varna showed COVID-19 symptoms on CT scan, although regional health authorities have not yet confirmed the case.

==== 12 March ====
By 12 March, the number of cases had increased to 23, most of them in Sofia. Many of these had been in contact with the elderly couple admitted to the Pirogov Hospital on 10 March.

==== 13 March ====
On 13 March, after 16 reported cases in one day, Bulgaria declared a state of emergency for one month until 13 April. Schools, shopping centres, cinemas, restaurants, and other places of business were closed. All sports events were suspended. Only supermarkets, food markets, pharmacies, banks and gas stations remain open. Additionally, all arrivals from Italy, Iran, Spain, China and South Korea were placed under a mandatory 14-day quarantine. There were 13 breaches of quarantine; patients involved were returned to treatment facilities and warned of repercussions, including fines and prison sentences.

==== 14 March ====
On 14 March, a second death and a third case in Pleven were reported. The second death from the virus was the 74-year-old husband of the first victim. Late in the evening on 31 March a member of parliament was tested positive for the virus. All MPs were urgently tested on the following day. If some of them are also tested positive, the Parliament will be adjourned. Options for the MPs to continue their legislative work (including voting) online from home under isolation are being explored.

==== 15 March ====
The number of confirmed cases in Bulgaria rose to 51 on 15 March. A total of 83 tests were done at the Military Medical Academy, of which six were positive, and 51 were processed at the National Reference Laboratory, of which two were positive. In Varna, one test out of 12 samples proved positive.

==== 16 March ====
The Ministry of Health announced that citizens from a number of countries would be prohibited from entering Bulgaria starting 00:00 on 18 March. These are China, Iran, Bangladesh, India, the Maldives, Nepal, Sri Lanka, Spain, Italy, South Korea, France, Germany, the Netherlands, Switzerland and the United Kingdom. Additionally, sanitary control units will be established on some border crossings with Romania, Greece, Serbia and North Macedonia. The number of total cases rose to 62, including two British citizens vacationing in Bansko.

==== 17 March ====
81 cases were reported, several linked to an outbreak in Bansko. None of the patients were in critical condition.

==== 18 March ====
The total number of cases increased to 94 by 18 March, with new cases appearing in Smolyan, Veliko Tarnovo and Pernik among recent arrivals from outside the country. The previous day, Bansko became the first town in the country to be put under quarantine.

==== 19 March ====
On 19 March the cases rose to 105 and an 80-year-old woman, who recently had a stroke, died from COVID-19 on the same day, making her the third death from the disease in Bulgaria. Elsewhere, a 78-year-old Bulgarian citizen died from COVID-19 while visiting family in Pittsburgh, Pennsylvania. The woman, a choir conductor in Sofia, was uninsured and refused to seek medical attention.

==== 20 March ====
The total number of cases increased to 127 and the first recovery occurred.

==== 21 March ====
The number of cases increased to 142 by noon, and three patients had recovered. Two cities, Dobrich and Shumen, confirmed their first cases, the latter related to the Bansko cluster. There are 84 male and 58 female patients, the youngest being 4 years old, and the oldest 81 years old. More than 5,000 tests had been carried out, and an additional 10,000 tests would be made available at short notice.

==== 24 March ====
The cases increased to 218 and the first case in Stara Zagora province was confirmed. A man from the town of Kazanlak was admitted in the Infectious unit in the hospital in Stara Zagora. He is believed to be 60 years old and returned from France on 14 March.

==== 25 March ====
The number of cases increased to 242 by the end of the day, with the city of Sliven reporting its first confirmed case. 16 new cases with no relation between them were registered in Sofia, with some being medical staff from a local hospital. Two new cases were confirmed in Blagoevgrad, two in Plovdiv and one in Pleven. Two of the patients who were in critical condition were stabilized but remain "in stable but severe condition". One recovered completely, bringing the number of total recoveries to 5.

==== 26 March ====
A total of 22 new cases were reported, bringing the overall number to 264. The coronavirus was registered for the first time in Kardzhali and Haskovo. 15 of the newly confirmed cases were in Sofia, 2 in Smolyan, one in Pleven, one in Veliko Tarnovo and one in Varna. Two people were admitted to hospital in critical condition, while three new patients recovered, bringing the number of recovered to 8. Three soldiers were confirmed to be infected – two were stationed in Kosovo and were immediately brought back to Sofia, and the other contracted the virus in Romania, where he was hospitalized.

==== 27 March ====
29 new cases were registered, with the total number reaching 293. From these, 17 were in Sofia, 5 in Plovdiv, 3 in Burgas, and one each in Varna, Kyustendil, Sliven and Pazardzhik. At least 93 people remained hospitalized, with 53 in Sofia alone.

==== 28 March ====
The total number of cases reached 331, an increase of 38 from the previous day. The new cases included 19 in Sofia, 5 in Blagoevgrad, 4 in Burgas, 3 in Varna, 2 each in Kardzhali, Plovdiv and Shumen, and 1 in Smolyan. Four new deaths were also reported, with two occurring in Blagoevgrad and one each in Kyustendil and Sofia. The cases in Blagoevgrad, a mother and her daughter, were initially refused admission to the local hospital despite visible symptoms and had to request testing at a private lab; by the time the results came out as positive, the patients' condition had deteriorated significantly. They were eventually admitted and sent to intensive care, but both died shortly after.

==== 29 March ====
A total of 15 new cases were reported, with 8 in Sofia, 3 in Plovdiv, and one each in Kardzhali, Sliven, Smolyan and Varna. Three new recoveries were also announced, while the number of deaths rose to 8 after a 51-year-old woman died in the Blagoevgrad hospital, one day after her mother had died from the virus. The Ministry of Health announced that 125 out of 324 active cases remain hospitalized, with 13 of those in serious condition. The total number of tests performed exceeded 7,000, with 276 done on 29 March alone.

==== 30 March ====
Thirteen new cases were reported, with seven in Sofia and one each in Blagoevgrad, Kardzhali, Montana, Pleven, Plovdiv and Sliven, for a total of 359 cases. 113 patients remained hospitalized, with 13 in serious condition. Around 56% of all those infected so far were male versus 44% female, with a median age of 45. The total number of recoveries rose to 17.

==== 31 March ====
The total number of confirmed infections increased by 40 to 399, and the first two cases were reported from the province of Silistra. 20 of the new cases were registered in Sofia, four each in Burgas and Kyustendil, three each in Plovdiv and Varna, two in Silistra, and one each in Kardzhali, Pernik, Shumen and Stara Zagora. The number of hospitalized patients increased to 146, with 14 in serious condition, while 20 medical workers were announced to have contracted the disease so far. No new deaths or recoveries were announced. From the total of 399 confirmed cases, just under 57% (227) were male, versus 43% (172) who were female.

=== April ===
==== 1 April ====
The province of Ruse reported its first case as part of 23 new infections across the country, bringing the total to 422. In addition to Ruse, 10 new cases were reported in Sofia, two each in Blagoevgrad, Burgas, Dobrich and Plovdiv, and one each in Haskovo, Kardzhali, Sliven and Stara Zagora. Two deaths were registered – a 57-year-old man in Kyustendil and a 40-year-old man in Sofia. Hassan Ademov from the Movement for Rights and Freedoms became the first Bulgarian member of parliament to contract the virus, forcing the announcement of a mass test on 2 April that would cover government staff and all 240 MPs.

==== 2 April ====
The total number of infections increased by 35 to 457, with the first case being reported from the province of Vidin. The new cases included 20 in Sofia, four in Smolyan, three in Varna, two in Dobrich, and one each in Blagoevgrad, Montana, Pazardzhik, Plovdiv, Veliko Tarnovo and Vidin. No new deaths were reported, while the number of recoveries reached 25. 179 patients were currently hospitalized, with 18 in intensive care. A further two MPs were among the new cases, both from the ruling GERB party, including their parliamentary group speaker Daniela Daritkova.

==== 3 April ====
The National Assembly approved the government's proposal to extend the state of emergency by one month until 13 May. The confirmed case count reached 487, after 28 new infections were registered – 18 in Sofia, two each in Plovdiv and Smolyan, and one each in Blagoevgrad, Burgas, Kardzhali, Kyustendil, Veliko Tarnovo and Vidin. Four deaths were also announced, with one occurring late on the previous evening in Stara Zagora. Male patients continued to account for just under 57% of all cases (versus 43% female), with a median age of 47.

==== 5 April ====
The Ministry of Health announced that the total number of COVID-19 tests had reached 15,899, with 8 laboratories performing the procedure across the country.

==== 14 April ====
The village of Panicherovo in Stara Zagora Province was placed under quarantine, after a COVID-19 positive man escaped from a hospital where he was being treated and returned to the village.

==== 15 April ====
The Ministry of Interior established checkpoints limiting movement in and out of the predominantly Roma-populated Sofia neighborhoods of Filipovtsi and Fakulteta. The neighborhoods were categorized as COVID-19 clusters by the National Crisis Management center.

==== 16 April ====
In a late night emergency joint press conference of the Minister of Interior, the Minister of Health, and the Chairman of the National Crisis Management center, it was announced that entering and exiting Sofia would be severely limited until further notice following increased traffic out of the city before the Easter holidays. Following numerous imported cases from Britain (e.g. a 78-years old Briton whose sister was known to have been infected by the coronavirus and a Bulgarian repatriate from Varna) the Civil Aviation Authority put a ban on all flights between Britain and Bulgaria. The decree refers to the sharp increase in COVID-19 cases in that country for the last weeks surpassing the level in other concerned countries. Three days before the measure was implemented the Governor of Varna Oblast had expressed his apprehension regarding the flights between Varna and London.

==== 20 April ====
The ministry of Health announced the renewal of planned surgeries and hospitalizations, immunizations, child and prenatal care. These will be conducted under strict schedule on Tuesday and Thursday of each week.

==== 21 April ====
The hour limitations on entering and exiting Sofia were lifted.

==== 27 April ====
The prohibition of the passenger air traffic between Bulgaria and Britain was revoked after 11 days.

=== May ===
==== 1 May ====
Compulsory mask-wearing in open public spaces was rescinded with a new decree by the Minister of Health. National parks outside municipal boundaries, closed to the public on 20 March, were reopened, with local authorities commissioned to provide the organization for visitors.

==== 2 May ====
The first case in the province of Razgrad was confirmed, meaning that now 27 out of 28 provinces have proven cases of COVID-19. On this day also, was recorded the first death of a medic. A 43-years-old female doctor from Sliven died after contracting the disease. She worked in the Infectious Diseases Department in the city of Sliven.

==== 4 May ====
Andrea Ammon, Director of ECDC, listed Bulgaria as the only country monitored by the Centre still seeing an increase in newly registered cases.

==== 6 May ====
Checkpoints outside provincial centres were removed and restrictions limiting inter-city travel lifted.

==== 9 May ====
Targovishte, the last Bulgarian province without any registered cases yet, had its first COVID-19 case confirmed.

==== 14 May ====
As of 14 May at 00:00, the national emergency was lifted, and in its place was declared a state of an emergency epidemic situation. Organ transplantations are allowed again after a 2-month ban. Parks are open for the use of all. Most of the anti-epidemic measures are still valid. The 14-day quarantine for everyone who enters the country remains. Schools and daycares remain closed, as well as shopping centers and indoor restaurants.

=== June ===
==== 21 June ====
Bulgarian tennis player Grigor Dimitrov announced on his Instagram account that he has tested positive for COVID-19 which lead to the cancellation of Adria Tour, which he had been participating in.

=== August ===
==== 1 August ====
It was announced that Bulgarian tennis player Viktoriya Tomova had tested positive for COVID-19 on the site of a tournament in Palermo, Italy which happened to be the first official pro tennis event after the pandemic began. Tomova tested positive shortly before her scheduled qualifying match against Marta Kostyuk and withdrew from the tournament; organisers said all anti-epidemic protocols had been observed and that her close contacts would be tested.

==== 23 August ====
Bulgaria's Minister of Youth and Sports Krasen Kralev tested positive.

=== October ===
==== 25 October ====
Bulgarian Prime Minister Boyko Borisov tested positive. He said on Facebook that he had "general malaise."

=== November ===
By 10 November, Boyko Borisov had recovered from COVID-19.

On 28 November 2020, Bulgaria entered a second lockdown, which was characterized as a "partial" one due to being less strict than the first, and was envisioned to be in place until Christmas. This decision was regarded by many experts as being long overdue because of the huge strain on the country's health system, resulting in many people not being able to receive access to adequate medical care, and the Prime Minister faced strong criticism from other politicians.

=== December ===
On 18 December 2020, the government confirmed that the lockdown will be extended until 31 January 2021.

On 27 December 2020, Bulgaria joined other European Union member states in launching its COVID-19 vaccination campaign, with initial inoculations taking place simultaneously in Sofia, Plovdiv and Bourgas. The Pfizer-BioNTech vaccine was the first to be administered; recipients on the opening day included Health Minister Kostadin Angelov, who received his dose at St Anna Hospital in Sofia, alongside National Crisis-management Staff chairman Major-General Ventsislav Mutafchiyski and medical workers representing hospitals in all three cities. The government stated that vaccination was voluntary, recommended and free of charge.

=== March 2021 ===
From 22 March until 31 March 2021 the country was under another lockdown, the third one since the start of the pandemic.

=== May 2021 ===
During the second half of the month the weekly positivity rate fell to below 4%, with the number of people testing positive the lowest since early October 2020.

=== June 2021 ===
In June 2021, genomic sequencing confirmed the presence of the Beta and Delta variants in Bulgaria.

=== July 2021 ===
By the second half of July 2021, Delta had emerged as the dominant variant (showing up in over 50% of genomic sequencing samples), starting to displace Alpha.

=== August 2021 ===
By mid August close to 99% of the samples tested positive for Delta.

=== October 2021 ===
Due to the worsening epidemiological situation, a "green certificate" that could be obtained by showing proof of vaccination, recovery from an infection or a negative COVID-19 test was introduced as a requirement for many public activities from 21 October. It was also regarded as a way of avoiding another lockdown.

=== November 2021 ===
The presence of the 'Delta Plus' subvariant was confirmed in November 2021.

=== December 2021 ===
On 22 December 2021, the Cibalab private laboratories signalled that the Omicron variant had been discovered in six virus samples. Iva Hristova, head of the Center for Infectious and Parasitic Diseases, insisted that the presence of Omicron will need to be confirmed through genomic sequencing, for which the private laboratories do not possess the technology, with accurate findings expected to become available after the new year. Mathematician Ognyan Kunchev has stated that the sequencing process in Bulgaria takes around 10 days and needs to be sped up as well as cover more samples. On 29 December 2021, virologist Radka Argirova who serves as an advisor of Prime Minister Kiril Petkov stated that there are strong indications that Omicron is already in Bulgaria, referring to a number of suspected cases, all of them among people who had travelled abroad.

=== January 2022 ===
==== Variant changes ====
On 2 January 2022, the first 12 cases of the Omicron variant were officially confirmed by the health authorities. 11 of them were in Sofia City Province while 1 was in Sofia Province, with 7 of the cases among non-vaccinated, 5 among vaccinated and none among people with a booster dose. Only one of the people infected with Omicron had recently been abroad. Omicron was found in 4.4% of the 275 sequenced samples with Delta making up the rest. None of the infected required hospitalization. As of 10 January 2022, 52 new cases of Omicron had been discovered, based on 505 sequenced samples for the period up to 3 January, with Omicron accounting for 10.3% of the swabs, with the rest being Delta. As of 19 January 2022, 227 new cases of Omicron had been identified, based on 522 sequenced samples for the period up to 10 January, with the ratio of Omicron to Delta being 43.5% to 56.75%. By mid to late January 2022, Omicron had emerged as the main variant, accounting for 74.5% of cases by 20 January, being found in 249 out of 334 samples.

==== Rise in cases ====
On 12 January 2022, 7,062 new cases were registered, the most since the start of the pandemic, exceeding the previous record number of 6,816 daily positive tests reported on 27 October 2021. After the health authorities reported 9,996 positive tests on 18 January 2022, on the next day the number of registered daily cases surpassed 10,000 for the first time, with 11,181 new infections announced for the previous 24 hours. On 26 January 2022, a new high of 12,399 official cases was reported by the Ministry of Health.

==== Reinfections and coinfections ====
As of 14 January 2022, there have been 4692 officially recorded reinfections in Bulgaria. According to an academic paper analyzing the period between March 2020 and December 2021, there had been 31 cases of people infected three times and one instance of an individual contracting COVID-19 for a fourth time. In late January 2022, the first instance of COVID-19 and influenza A (strain H3N2) co-infection was confirmed.

==== Rules regarding COVID-19 positive people ====
From 11 January 2022, the mandatory isolation requirement for people with a positive COVID-19 test was reduced from 14 to 10 days.

=== February 2022 ===
On 4 February 2022, the health authorities confirmed the presence of the BA.2 subvariant of Omicron, which had been discovered in 7 samples from Sofia, Bourgas and Targovishte. The BA.3 sublineage was detected as well. According to assessments, the fifth wave of the virus, which had begun without the full subsiding of the fourth, peaked in late January and early February.

=== April 2022 ===
On 1 April 2022 the emergency epidemiological situation in Bulgaria was lifted by the Council of Ministers, resulting in the abolishment of virtually all non-pharmaceutical interventions such as capacity limits for venues and mask mandates, with protective face coverings continuing to be recommended in indoor spaces and any high risk environments. The decision to drop restrictions has generally been regarded as being in line with the improved epidemiological situation, following the trends in other European countries, though some experts have characterized it as hasty due to the low vaccination coverage of the population and cautioned that it could lead to false sense of calm that the pandemic is over. Concerns have also been expressed about the reduction in the testing for the virus. Members of the business sector have criticized the declaration of an end to the epidemiological situation as an excuse for the government to stop offering financial compensations. According to a law passed by the National Parliament on 13 April 2022, the burden for the introduction of new measures will to an extent shift from the Minister of Health to the regional health authorities, with the restrictions thus envisioned to be regional rather than nationwide. However, the Health Minister retains the prerogative to introduce pandemic control measures. In late April 2022, mathematician Nikolay Vitanov stated that the reproduction number for the virus in Bulgaria is 0.82, characterizing the situation in the country as lacking the diffuse spread of Western Europe, which he believed to have been a factor behind the decision to remove the restrictions.

=== May 2022 ===
From 1 May 2022, the pandemic-related requirements regarding the entry of foreign citizens, such as proof of vaccination, were dropped.

=== June 2022 ===
On 29 June 2022, the Ministry of Health announced that the presence of the BA.5 subvariant of Omicron had been confirmed after genomic sequencing of 88 samples from all over the country taken in the period from 5 May to 3 June. BA.2 was by far the dominant subvariant, accounting for more than 75% of the cases.

=== July 2022 ===
In July 2022, the BA.5 Omicron subvariant began emerging as dominant over the other ones, being the most frequently detected in samples. It had spread the most in the capital Sofia.

On 25 July 2022, face masks once again became compulsory for all citizens using public transport in Sofia.

=== August 2022 ===
From 4 August 2022 there was a further tightening of the epidemiological control measures in the capital, with face masks starting to be required for most indoor spaces as well as other requirements pertaining to social distancing, disinfection and capacity limits being introduced. Following the appointment of Asen Medzhidiev as caretaker Health Minister, from 11 August 2022, the pandemic-related measures in Sofia, especially those pertaining to masks, were once again relaxed, and a large amount of free rapid antigen tests were provided. From 25 August 2022, the mask requirement for public transport was dropped. Facial coverings remained compulsory in medical settings.

=== October 2022 ===
In October 2022, two additional Omicron subvariants – BQ.1.1 and BM.1.1 – were confirmed to be present in the country. BA.5x remained the dominant subvariant, being found in around 71% of genomic sequencing samples for the period between 11 September and 12 October.

=== November 2022 ===
In mid November 2022 it was confirmed that from 17 November all public health measures related to COVID-19 will be lifted.

=== January 2023 ===
In January 2023 the XBB.1.5 strain was detected for the first time, being discovered in an individual from Sofia.

== Statistics ==
=== Cases and tests ===
Cases of coronavirus in Bulgaria
Number of confirmed cases on a logarithmic scale

| Day | New cases | Total cases | Total deaths | Total recoveries | Total active | Tested |
|---|---|---|---|---|---|---|
| 8 March 2020 | 4 | 4 | 0 | 0 | 4 | 99 |
| 9 March 2020 | 0 | 4 | 0 | 0 | 4 | 158 |
| 10 March 2020 | 2 | 6 | 0 | 0 | 6 | 199 |
| 11 March 2020 | 1 | 7 | 1 | 0 | 6 | 231 |
| 12 March 2020 | 16 | 23 | 1 | 0 | 22 | 99 |
| 13 March 2020 | 8 | 31 | 1 | 0 | 30 | ? |
| 14 March 2020 | 10 | 41 | 2 | 0 | 39 | 183 |
| 15 March 2020 | 10 | 51 | 2 | 0 | 49 | ? |
| 16 March 2020 | 11 | 62 | 2 | 0 | 60 | 240 |
| 17 March 2020 | 19 | 81 | 2 | 0 | 79 | ? |
| 18 March 2020 | 13 | 94 | 2 | 0 | 92 | 332 |
| 19 March 2020 | 18 | 112 | 3 | 0 | 109 | ? |
| 20 March 2020 | 15 | 127 | 3 | 1 | 123 | 129 |
| 21 March 2020 | 36 | 163 | 3 | 3 | 157 | ? |
| 22 March 2020 | 24 | 187 | 3 | 3 | 181 | ? |
| 23 March 2020 | 14 | 201 | 3 | 3 | 195 | ? |
| 24 March 2020 | 17 | 218 | 3 | 3 | 212 | ? |
| 25 March 2020 | 24 | 242 | 3 | 4 | 235 | 350 |
| 26 March 2020 | 22 | 264 | 3 | 8 | 253 | 276 (Note: The total number of tests reached 6,454.) |
| 27 March 2020 | 29 | 293 | 3 | 9 | 281 | ? |
| 28 March 2020 | 38 | 331 | 7 | 11 | 313 | ? |
| 29 March 2020 | 15 | 346 | 8 | 14 | 324 | 276 (Note: The total number of tests exceeded 7,000.) |
| 30 March 2020 | 13 | 359 | 8 | 17 | 334 | ? |
| 31 March 2020 | 40 | 399 | 8 | 17 | 374 | ? |
| 1 April 2020 | 23 | 422 | 9 | 20 | 392 | 566 |
| 2 April 2020 | 35 | 457 | 10 | 25 | 421 | 390 |
| 3 April 2020 | 28 | 485 | 14 | 30 | 440 | 350 |
| 4 April 2020 | 18 | 503 | 17 | 34 | 451 | 400 |
| 5 April 2020 | 28 | 531 | 20 | 37 | 474 | 252 (Note: The total number of tests reached 15,899.) |
| 6 April 2020 | 18 | 549 | 22 | 39 | 488 | 299 |
| 7 April 2020 | 28 | 577 | 23 | 42 | 512 | 496 |
| 8 April 2020 | 16 | 593 | 24 | 42 | 527 | 498 |
| 9 April 2020 | 25 | 618 | 24 | 48 | 545 | 494 |
| 10 April 2020 | 17 | 635 | 25 | 54 | 555 | ? |
| 11 April 2020 | 26 | 661 | 28 | 62 | 571 | 376 |
| 12 April 2020 | 14 | 675 | 29 | 68 | 577 | 219 |
| 13 April 2020 | 10 | 685 | 32 | 71 | 582 | ? |
| 14 April 2020 | 28 | 713 | 35 | 81 | 597 | ? |
| 15 April 2020 | 34 | 747 | 36 | 105 | 606 | ? |
| 16 April 2020 | 53 | 800 | 38 | 122 | 640 | ? |
| 17 April 2020 | 46 | 846 | 41 | 141 | 664 | ? |
| 18 April 2020 | 32 | 878 | 41 | 153 | 684 | ? |
| 19 April 2020 | 16 | 894 | 42 | 161 | 691 | 500 |
| 20 April 2020 | 35 | 929 | 43 | 167 | 719 | 424 |
| 21 April 2020 | 46 | 975 | 45 | 170 | 760 | 345 |
| 22 April 2020 | 49 | 1,024 | 49 | 174 | 801 | 743 |
| 23 April 2020 | 73 | 1,097 | 52 | 190 | 855 | 788 |
| 24 April 2020 | 91 | 1,188 | 54 | 193 | 941 | 1,238 |
| 25 April 2020 | 59 | 1,247 | 55 | 197 | 995 | 1,105 |
| 26 April 2020 | 53 | 1,300 | 56 | 205 | 1,039 | 778 |
| 27 April 2020 | 63 | 1,363 | 58 | 206 | 1,099 | 1,128 |
| 28 April 2020 | 36 | 1,399 | 58 | 222 | 1,119 | 859 |
| 29 April 2020 | 48 | 1,447 | 64 | 243 | 1,140 | 1,156 |
| 30 April 2020 | 59 | 1,506 | 66 | 266 | 1,174 | 1,302 |
| 1 May 2020 | 49 | 1,555 | 68 | 276 | 1,211 | 1,126 |
| 2 May 2020 | 39 | 1,594 | 72 | 287 | 1,235 | 982 |
| 3 May 2020 | 24 | 1,618 | 73 | 308 | 1,237 | 527 |
| 4 May 2020 | 34 | 1,652 | 78 | 321 | 1,253 | 1,158 |
| 5 May 2020 | 52 | 1,704 | 80 | 342 | 1,282 | 1,465 |
| 6 May 2020 | 74 | 1,778 | 84 | 360 | 1,334 | 1,163 |
| 7 May 2020 | 51 | 1,829 | 84 | 384 | 1,361 | 1,397 |
| 8 May 2020 | 43 | 1,872 | 86 | 401 | 1,385 | 1,777 |
| 9 May 2020 | 49 | 1,921 | 90 | 422 | 1,409 | 1,126 |
| 10 May 2020 | 44 | 1,965 | 91 | 444 | 1,430 | 403 |
| 11 May 2020 | 25 | 1,990 | 93 | 461 | 1,436 | 1,079 |
| 12 May 2020 | 33 | 2,023 | 95 | 476 | 1,452 | 1,387 |
| 13 May 2020 | 46 | 2,069 | 96 | 499 | 1,474 | 1,388 |
| 14 May 2020 | 31 | 2,100 | 99 | 521 | 1,480 | 1,611 |
| 15 May 2020 | 38 | 2,138 | 102 | 545 | 1,491 | 1,608 |
| 16 May 2020 | 37 | 2,175 | 105 | 573 | 1,497 | 1,161 |
| 17 May 2020 | 36 | 2,211 | 108 | 598 | 1,505 | 1,094 |
| 18 May 2020 | 24 | 2,235 | 110 | 612 | 1,513 | 362 |
| 19 May 2020 | 24 | 2,259 | 112 | 646 | 1,501 | 874 |
| 20 May 2020 | 33 | 2,292 | 116 | 684 | 1,492 | 1,432 |
| 21 May 2020 | 39 | 2,331 | 120 | 727 | 1,484 | 1,912 |
| 22 May 2020 | 41 | 2,372 | 125 | 769 | 1,478 | 1,450 |
| 23 May 2020 | 36 | 2,408 | 126 | 808 | 1,474 | 1,605 |
| 24 May 2020 | 19 | 2,427 | 130 | 840 | 1,457 | 886 |
| 25 May 2020 | 6 | 2,433 | 130 | 862 | 1,441 | 443 |
| 26 May 2020 | 10 | 2,443 | 130 | 880 | 1,433 | 295 |
| 27 May 2020 | 17 | 2,460 | 133 | 912 | 1,415 | 1,557 |
| 28 May 2020 | 17 | 2,477 | 134 | 965 | 1,378 | 1,273 |
| 29 May 2020 | 8 | 2,485 | 136 | 1,015 | 1,334 | 1,725 |
| 30 May 2020 | 14 | 2,499 | 139 | 1,064 | 1,296 | 1,353 |
| 31 May 2020 | 14 | 2,513 | 140 | 1,074 | 1,299 | 606 |
| 1 June 2020 | 6 | 2,519 | 140 | 1,090 | 1,289 | 346 |
| 2 June 2020 | 19 | 2,538 | 144 | 1,123 | 1,271 | 1,220 |
| 3 June 2020 | 22 | 2,560 | 146 | 1,206 | 1,208 | 1,347 |
| 4 June 2020 | 25 | 2,585 | 147 | 1,322 | 1,116 | 1,174 |
| 5 June 2020 | 42 | 2,627 | 159 | 1,390 | 1,078 | 1,276 |
| 6 June 2020 | 41 | 2,668 | 160 | 1,528 | 980 | 1,196 |
| 7 June 2020 | 43 | 2,711 | 160 | 1,545 | 1,006 | 816 |
| 8 June 2020 | 16 | 2,727 | 160 | 1,548 | 1,019 | 427 |
| 9 June 2020 | 83 | 2,810 | 164 | 1,587 | 1,059 | 1,406 |
| 10 June 2020 | 79 | 2,889 | 167 | 1,623 | 1,099 | 1,777 |
| 11 June 2020 | 104 | 2,993 | 167 | 1,664 | 1,162 | 2,308 |
| 12 June 2020 | 93 | 3,086 | 168 | 1,688 | 1,230 | 2,640 |
| 13 June 2020 | 105 | 3,191 | 172 | 1,716 | 1,303 | 2,642 |
| 14 June 2020 | 75 | 3,266 | 172 | 1,723 | 1,371 | 1,975 |
| 15 June 2020 | 24 | 3,290 | 174 | 1,730 | 1,386 | 1,409 |
| 16 June 2020 | 51 | 3,341 | 176 | 1,784 | 1,381 | 1,794 |
| 17 June 2020 | 112 | 3,453 | 181 | 1,817 | 1,455 | 2,045 |
| 18 June 2020 | 89 | 3,542 | 184 | 1,880 | 1,478 | 2,054 |
| 19 June 2020 | 132 | 3,674 | 190 | 1,941 | 1,543 | 2,104 |
| 20 June 2020 | 81 | 3,755 | 193 | 2,008 | 1,554 | 2,371 |
| 21 June 2020 | 117 | 3,872 | 199 | 2,027 | 1,646 | 1,360 |
| 22 June 2020 | 33 | 3,905 | 199 | 2,074 | 1,632 | 566 |
| 23 June 2020 | 79 | 3,984 | 207 | 2,171 | 1,606 | 2,776 |
| 24 June 2020 | 130 | 4,114 | 208 | 2,217 | 1,689 | 2,946 |
| 25 June 2020 | 128 | 4,242 | 209 | 2,263 | 1,770 | 3,016 |
| 26 June 2020 | 166 | 4,408 | 211 | 2,370 | 1,827 | 2,775 |
| 27 June 2020 | 105 | 4,513 | 215 | 2,457 | 1,841 | 2,750 |
| 28 June 2020 | 112 | 4,625 | 216 | 2,475 | 1,934 | 1,528 |
| 29 June 2020 | 66 | 4,691 | 219 | 2,508 | 1,964 | 1,034 |
| 30 June 2020 | 140 | 4,831 | 223 | 2,582 | 2,026 | 4,525 |
| 1 July 2020 | 158 | 4,989 | 230 | 2,676 | 2,083 | 3,343 |
| 2 July 2020 | 165 | 5,154 | 232 | 2,722 | 2,200 | 2,896 |
| 3 July 2020 | 161 | 5,315 | 232 | 2,802 | 2,281 | 3,155 |
| 4 July 2020 | 182 | 5,497 | 239 | 2,892 | 2,366 | 2,538 |
| 5 July 2020 | 180 | 5,677 | 241 | 2,898 | 2,538 | 2,591 |
| 6 July 2020 | 63 | 5,740 | 246 | 2,915 | 2,579 | 923 |
| 7 July 2020 | 174 | 5,914 | 250 | 3,000 | 2,664 | 2,775 |
| 8 July 2020 | 188 | 6,102 | 254 | 3,037 | 2,811 | 3,467 |
| 9 July 2020 | 240 | 6,342 | 259 | 3,166 | 2,917 | 4,286 |
| 10 July 2020 | 330 | 6,672 | 262 | 3,229 | 3,181 | 3,686 |
| 11 July 2020 | 292 | 6,964 | 267 | 3,308 | 3,389 | 4,540 |
| 12 July 2020 | 211 | 7,175 | 267 | 3,311 | 3,597 | 2,806 |
| 13 July 2020 | 77 | 7,252 | 268 | 3,319 | 3,665 | 1,198 |
| 14 July 2020 | 159 | 7,411 | 276 | 3,517 | 3,618 | 3,341 |
| 15 July 2020 | 234 | 7,645 | 283 | 3,663 | 3,699 | 4,885 |
| 16 July 2020 | 232 | 7,877 | 289 | 3,841 | 3,747 | 5,393 |
| 17 July 2020 | 267 | 8,144 | 293 | 3,927 | 3,924 | 6,526 |
| 18 July 2020 | 298 | 8,442 | 297 | 4,033 | 4,112 | 4,884 |
| 19 July 2020 | 196 | 8,638 | 299 | 4,081 | 4,258 | 2,003 |
| 20 July 2020 | 95 | 8,733 | 300 | 4,106 | 4,327 | 3,155 |
| 21 July 2020 | 196 | 8,929 | 308 | 4,205 | 4,416 | 3,686 |
| 22 July 2020 | 325 | 9,254 | 313 | 4,521 | 4,420 | 5,365 |
| 23 July 2020 | 330 | 9,584 | 321 | 4,643 | 4,620 | 6,183 |
| 24 July 2020 | 269 | 9,853 | 329 | 5,031 | 4,493 | 5,913 |
| 25 July 2020 | 270 | 10,123 | 337 | 5,252 | 4,534 | 5,963 |
| 26 July 2020 | 189 | 10,312 | 338 | 5,306 | 4,668 | 2,161 |
| 27 July 2020 | 115 | 10,427 | 340 | 5,355 | 4,732 | 3,502 |
| 28 July 2020 | 194 | 10,621 | 347 | 5,585 | 4,689 | 3,832 |
| 29 July 2020 | 250 | 10,871 | 355 | 5,766 | 4,750 | 5,303 |
| 30 July 2020 | 284 | 11,155 | 368 | 5,971 | 4,816 | 6,395 |
| 31 July 2020 | 265 | 11,420 | 374 | 6,173 | 4,873 | 6,639 |
| 1 August 2020 | 270 | 11,690 | 383 | 6,319 | 4,988 | 5,582 |
| 2 August 2020 | 146 | 11,836 | 385 | 6,396 | 5,055 | 3,955 |
| 3 August 2020 | 119 | 11,955 | 388 | 6,420 | 5,147 | 1,491 |
| 4 August 2020 | 204 | 12,159 | 404 | 6,684 | 5,071 | 4,137 |
| 5 August 2020 | 255 | 12,414 | 415 | 6,964 | 5,035 | 5,325 |
| 6 August 2020 | 303 | 12,717 | 424 | 7,154 | 5,139 | 5,701 |
| 7 August 2020 | 297 | 13,014 | 435 | 7,374 | 5,205 | 6,433 |
| 8 August 2020 | 195 | 13,209 | 442 | 7,622 | 5,145 | 5,837 |
| 9 August 2020 | 134 | 13,343 | 445 | 7,718 | 5,180 | 3,612 |
| 10 August 2020 | 53 | 13,396 | 447 | 7,772 | 5,177 | 1,275 |
| 11 August 2020 | 116 | 13,512 | 459 | 7,980 | 5,073 | 3,667 |
| 12 August 2020 | 210 | 13,722 | 471 | 8,154 | 5,097 | 5,388 |
| 13 August 2020 | 171 | 13,893 | 482 | 8,479 | 4,932 | 5,108 |
| 14 August 2020 | 176 | 14,069 | 484 | 8,901 | 4,684 | 5,877 |
| 15 August 2020 | 174 | 14,243 | 492 | 9,114 | 4,637 | 5,934 |
| 16 August 2020 | 90 | 14,333 | 495 | 9,161 | 4,677 | 2,745 |
| 17 August 2020 | 32 | 14,365 | 498 | 9,186 | 4,681 | 781 |
| 18 August 2020 | 135 | 14,500 | 512 | 9,442 | 4,546 | 5,252 |
| 19 August 2020 | 169 | 14,669 | 519 | 9,699 | 4,451 | 3,667 |
| 20 August 2020 | 151 | 14,820 | 527 | 9,931 | 4,362 | 8,649 |
| 21 August 2020 | 142 | 14,962 | 532 | 10,087 | 4,343 | 6,844 |
| 22 August 2020 | 169 | 15,131 | 539 | 10,282 | 4,310 | 6,373 |
| 23 August 2020 | 96 | 15,227 | 545 | 10,322 | 4,360 | 3,402 |
| 24 August 2020 | 60 | 15,287 | 545 | 10,338 | 4,404 | 2,288 |
| 25 August 2020 | 99 | 15,386 | 563 | 10,497 | 4,326 | 3,588 |
| 26 August 2020 | 203 | 15,589 | 572 | 10,601 | 4,416 | 6,232 |
| 27 August 2020 | 162 | 15,751 | 586 | 10,750 | 4,415 | 3,844 |
| 28 August 2020 | 157 | 15,908 | 594 | 11,044 | 4,270 | 7,639 |
| 29 August 2020 | 157 | 16,065 | 603 | 11,231 | 4,231 | 6,337 |
| 30 August 2020 | 99 | 16,164 | 605 | 11,253 | 4,306 | 4,787 |
| 31 August 2020 | 26 | 16,190 | 613 | 11,313 | 4,264 | 1,470 |
| 1 September 2020 | 76 | 16,266 | 629 | 11,483 | 4,154 | 4,330 |
| 2 September 2020 | 188 | 16,454 | 642 | 11,615 | 4,197 | 6,784 |
| 3 September 2020 | 163 | 16,617 | 648 | 11,760 | 4,209 | 5,443 |
| 4 September 2020 | 158 | 16,775 | 658 | 11,935 | 4,182 | 7,026 |
| 5 September 2020 | 179 | 16,954 | 665 | 12,046 | 4,243 | 8,129 |
| 6 September 2020 | 96 | 17,050 | 671 | 12,132 | 4,247 | 3,358 |
| 7 September 2020 | 39 | 17,089 | 676 | 12,157 | 4,256 | 1,407 |
| 8 September 2020 | 57 | 17,146 | 677 | 12,189 | 4,280 | 1,220 |
| 9 September 2020 | 167 | 17,313 | 692 | 12,297 | 4,324 | 3,923 |
| 10 September 2020 | 122 | 17,435 | 702 | 12,474 | 4,259 | 5,145 |
| 11 September 2020 | 163 | 17,598 | 706 | 12,619 | 4,273 | 5,090 |
| 12 September 2020 | 201 | 17,799 | 713 | 12,750 | 4,336 | 4,865 |
| 13 September 2020 | 92 | 17,891 | 717 | 12,758 | 4,416 | 2,330 |
| 14 September 2020 | 27 | 17,918 | 720 | 12,767 | 4,431 | 924 |
| 15 September 2020 | 143 | 18,061 | 729 | 12,930 | 4,402 | 3,163 |
| 16 September 2020 | 155 | 18,216 | 736 | 13,057 | 4,423 | 4,312 |
| 17 September 2020 | 174 | 18,390 | 739 | 13,241 | 4,410 | 4,835 |
| 18 September 2020 | 154 | 18,544 | 749 | 13,391 | 4,404 | 5,856 |
| 19 September 2020 | 189 | 18,733 | 753 | 13,510 | 4,470 | 6,042 |
| 20 September 2020 | 86 | 18,819 | 755 | 13,558 | 4,506 | 2,915 |
| 21 September 2020 | 44 | 18,863 | 761 | 13,580 | 4,522 | 1,249 |
| 22 September 2020 | 151 | 19,014 | 765 | 13,727 | 4,522 | 2,988 |
| 23 September 2020 | 109 | 19,123 | 767 | 13,748 | 4,608 | 3,049 |
| 24 September 2020 | 160 | 19,283 | 779 | 13,867 | 4,637 | 3,526 |
| 25 September 2020 | 290 | 19,573 | 785 | 14,013 | 4,775 | 4,859 |
| 26 September 2020 | 255 | 19,828 | 789 | 14,132 | 4,907 | 5,047 |
| 27 September 2020 | 169 | 19,997 | 789 | 14,160 | 5,048 | 2,710 |
| 28 September 2020 | 58 | 20,055 | 796 | 14,176 | 5,083 | 1,103 |
| 29 September 2020 | 216 | 20,271 | 807 | 14,339 | 5,125 | 3,302 |
| 30 September 2020 | 276 | 20,547 | 813 | 14,489 | 5,245 | 4,736 |
| 1 October 2020 | 286 | 20,833 | 825 | 14,634 | 5,374 | 4,943 |
| 2 October 2020 | 263 | 21,096 | 832 | 14,787 | 5,477 | 4,843 |
| 3 October 2020 | 240 | 21,336 | 838 | 14,939 | 5,559 | 4,820 |
| 4 October 2020 | 182 | 21,518 | 841 | 14,984 | 5,693 | 2,843 |
| 5 October 2020 | 69 | 21,587 | 844 | 15,014 | 5,729 | 1,278 |
| 6 October 2020 | 283 | 21,870 | 854 | 15,179 | 5,837 | 3,713 |
| 7 October 2020 | 436 | 22,306 | 862 | 15,310 | 6,134 | 5,431 |
| 8 October 2020 | 437 | 22,743 | 873 | 15,448 | 6,422 | 4,541 |
| 9 October 2020 | 516 | 23,259 | 880 | 15,563 | 6,816 | 5,209 |
| 10 October 2020 | 612 | 23,871 | 887 | 15,713 | 7,271 | 6,048 |
| 11 October 2020 | 448 | 24,319 | 891 | 15,818 | 7,610 | 3,795 |
| 12 October 2020 | 83 | 24,402 | 892 | 15,847 | 7,663 | 1,191 |
| 13 October 2020 | 587 | 24,989 | 915 | 15,975 | 8,099 | 4,320 |
| 14 October 2020 | 785 | 25,774 | 923 | 16,139 | 8,712 | 5,819 |
| 15 October 2020 | 819 | 26,593 | 929 | 16,489 | 9,175 | 5,898 |
| 16 October 2020 | 914 | 27,507 | 944 | 16,678 | 9,885 | 6,324 |
| 17 October 2020 | 998 | 28,505 | 958 | 16,875 | 10,672 | 7,442 |
| 18 October 2020 | 603 | 29,108 | 968 | 16,912 | 11,228 | 4,602 |
| 19 October 2020 | 395 | 29,503 | 986 | 16,943 | 11,574 | 1,518 |
| 20 October 2020 | 1,024 | 30,527 | 1,008 | 17,153 | 12,366 | 4,406 |
| 21 October 2020 | 1,336 | 31,863 | 1,019 | 17,414 | 13,430 | 11,505 |
| 22 October 2020 | 1,472 | 33,335 | 1,048 | 17,598 | 14,689 | 8,738 |
| 23 October 2020 | 1,595 | 34,930 | 1,064 | 17,833 | 16,033 | 9,038 |
| 24 October 2020 | 1,589 | 36,519 | 1,077 | 18,102 | 17,340 | 9,831 |
| 25 October 2020 | 1,043 | 37,562 | 1,084 | 18,232 | 18,246 | 7,094 |
| 26 October 2020 | 327 | 37,889 | 1,094 | 18,354 | 18,441 | 2,257 |
| 27 October 2020 | 2,243 | 40,132 | 1,136 | 18,650 | 20,346 | 7,659 |
| 28 October 2020 | 2,569 | 42,701 | 1,161 | 18,943 | 22,597 | 11,226 |
| 29 October 2020 | 2,760 | 45,461 | 1,197 | 19,159 | 25,105 | 9,946 |
| 30 October 2020 | 2,689 | 48,150 | 1,225 | 19,695 | 27,230 | 11,376 |
| 31 October 2020 | 2,891 | 51,041 | 1,254 | 19,877 | 29,910 | 12,634 |
| 1 November 2020 | 1,803 | 52,844 | 1,279 | 20,045 | 31,520 | 7,259 |
| 2 November 2020 | 1,225 | 54,069 | 1,298 | 20,530 | 32,241 | 5,547 |
| 3 November 2020 | 2,427 | 56,496 | 1,349 | 21,037 | 34,110 | 7,910 |
| 4 November 2020 | 4,041 | 60,537 | 1,412 | 21,544 | 37,581 | 11,066 |
| 5 November 2020 | 4,054 | 64,591 | 1,466 | 21,947 | 41,178 | 13,203 |
| 6 November 2020 | 3,754 | 68,345 | 1,518 | 22,709 | 44,118 | 11,131 |
| 7 November 2020 | 3,839 | 72,184 | 1,576 | 23,436 | 47,172 | 13,849 |
| 8 November 2020 | 2,301 | 74,485 | 1,632 | 23,805 | 49,048 | 8,702 |
| 9 November 2020 | 675 | 75,160 | 1,665 | 24,408 | 49,087 | 2,151 |
| 10 November 2020 | 3,816 | 78,976 | 1,771 | 25,283 | 51,922 | 8,826 |
| 11 November 2020 | 4,390 | 83,366 | 1,851 | 25,799 | 55,716 | 11,068 |
| 12 November 2020 | 3,945 | 87,311 | 1,898 | 26,714 | 58,699 | 10,830 |
| 13 November 2020 | 3,414 | 90,725 | 1,970 | 27,587 | 61,168 | 8,885 |
| 14 November 2020 | 4,212 | 94,937 | 2,055 | 28,269 | 64,613 | 12,413 |
| 15 November 2020 | 2,498 | 97,435 | 2,091 | 28,805 | 66,539 | 6,450 |
| 16 November 2020 | 816 | 98,251 | 2,130 | 29,375 | 66,746 | 2,716 |
| 17 November 2020 | 3,519 | 101,770 | 2,282 | 30,317 | 69,171 | 7,934 |
| 18 November 2020 | 4,828 | 106,598 | 2,413 | 31,536 | 72,649 | 11,611 |
| 19 November 2020 | 3,938 | 110,536 | 2,530 | 32,480 | 75,526 | 9,949 |
| 20 November 2020 | 3,899 | 114,435 | 2,649 | 33,327 | 78,459 | 10,311 |
| 21 November 2020 | 3,983 | 118,418 | 2,778 | 34,388 | 81,252 | 9,786 |
| 22 November 2020 | 2,279 | 120,697 | 2,820 | 35,752 | 82,125 | 5,729 |
| 23 November 2020 | 1,123 | 121,820 | 2,880 | 36,524 | 82,416 | 2,787 |
| 24 November 2020 | 3,146 | 124,966 | 3,069 | 38,226 | 83,671 | 7,244 |
| 25 November 2020 | 4,382 | 129,348 | 3,226 | 40,102 | 86,020 | 10,474 |
| 26 November 2020 | 3,712 | 133,060 | 3,367 | 42,620 | 87,073 | 8,820 |
| 27 November 2020 | 3,568 | 136,628 | 3,529 | 44,875 | 88,224 | 9,093 |
| 28 November 2020 | 3,327 | 139,955 | 3,680 | 46,740 | 89,535 | 9,179 |
| 29 November 2020 | 1,792 | 141,747 | 3,749 | 47,779 | 90,219 | 4,928 |
| 30 November 2020 | 739 | 142,486 | 3,814 | 48,594 | 90,078 | 1,965 |
| 1 December 2020 | 2,814 | 145,300 | 4,035 | 50,565 | 90,700 | 6,825 |
| 2 December 2020 | 3,475 | 148,775 | 4,188 | 53,000 | 91,587 | 9,056 |
| 3 December 2020 | 3,138 | 151,913 | 4,347 | 55,206 | 92,360 | 8,478 |
| 4 December 2020 | 3,280 | 155,193 | 4,503 | 57,141 | 93,549 | 9,082 |
| 5 December 2020 | 3,614 | 158,807 | 4,650 | 59,677 | 94,480 | 9,530 |
| 6 December 2020 | 2,037 | 160,844 | 4,729 | 60,673 | 95,442 | 5,986 |
| 7 December 2020 | 577 | 161,421 | 4,797 | 62,246 | 94,378 | 1,424 |
| 8 December 2020 | 2,764 | 164,185 | 5,010 | 65,616 | 93,559 | 6,260 |
| 9 December 2020 | 3,980 | 168,165 | 5,156 | 69,028 | 93,981 | 9,715 |
| 10 December 2020 | 3,328 | 171,493 | 5,283 | 72,078 | 94,132 | 8,578 |
| 11 December 2020 | 3,075 | 174,568 | 5,405 | 75,232 | 93,931 | 8,470 |
| 12 December 2020 | 3,097 | 177,665 | 5,562 | 79,522 | 92,581 | 8,587 |
| 13 December 2020 | 1,287 | 178,952 | 5,626 | 81,757 | 91,569 | 4,407 |
| 14 December 2020 | 497 | 179,449 | 5,688 | 83,720 | 90,041 | 1,634 |
| 15 December 2020 | 2,095 | 181,544 | 5,838 | 85,578 | 90,128 | 5,298 |
| 16 December 2020 | 2,743 | 184,287 | 6,005 | 87,935 | 90,347 | 7,737 |
| 17 December 2020 | 1,959 | 186,246 | 6,196 | 90,510 | 89,540 | 6,113 |
| 18 December 2020 | 2,042 | 188,288 | 6,339 | 93,728 | 88,221 | 6,825 |
| 19 December 2020 | 1,739 | 190,027 | 6,496 | 96,622 | 86,909 | 6,190 |
| 20 December 2020 | 1,002 | 191,029 | 6,551 | 98,026 | 86,452 | 4,213 |

==== Cases by age ====
New confirmed cases by age group (04.08.2020–19.02.2022)

=== New cases ===
==== Growth factor per day ====
Growth factor is defined as today's new cases / total cases on the previous day. It is indicative of the epidemic's evolution.

=== Tests performed ===
==== Tests per day (PCR + Antigen tests) ====
0 = No data

=== Percentage of tests that turned positive ===
==== Percentage of new cases from all tested (PCR + Antigen tests) ====
0 = No data

==== By province ====
Animated map of the total detected cases of COVID-19 per 100000 inhabitants in the Bulgarian provinces

Animated map of the detected cases of COVID-19 in two weeks per 100000 inhabitants in the Bulgarian provinces

=== Deaths ===
==== Weekly deaths in Bulgaria (2018–2022) ====
Data Source

=== Number of vaccinations per month (Pfizer-BioNTech + Moderna + AstraZeneca + Janssen) ===
The numbers only include first doses.

== Response ==
At the time of the announcement, schools had already been closed until 11 March due to an influenza B epidemic. A massive increase in influenza B cases prompted suspensions of routine medical examinations, and a recommendation by the government for suspension of lectures at universities. According to the latest Ministry of Health data, there were 2063 intensive care and 740 infectious disease hospital beds in the country, with a total of 1605 ventilators across the health system. However, Chief Health Inspector Angel Kunchev stated on 5 March that there was a shortage of medical personnel.

Following the announcement of positive SARS-CoV-2 test results, the Bulgarian government immediately banned the exports of protective equipment and placed orders for masks and protective suits to local manufacturers. In addition, 30,000 masks and 50,000 protective suits will be delivered by Turkey. Some 111,000 suits and masks are required every month and the government plans to distribute them to health workers, social assistants, law enforcement personnel and border guards. Sofia Municipality has increased disinfections to four times daily at public institutions and in public transport. Personnel in all hospitals was reportedly being screened for the disease, but in April a nurse in Vidin reported that she was refused a test after caring for a positive patient, as the hospital in the city had no testing kits.

By mid-March, large-scale imports of protective equipment from China, India and Vietnam had begun. Many volunteers were also signing up to join the handling of the crisis, including Nikola Vaptsarov Naval Academy cadets.

On 30 March, the Minister of Health Kiril Ananiev decreed wearing masks in public mandatory, both outdoors and indoors, despite nationwide protective equipment shortages and soaring prices. The policy seemed to contradict Ananiev's earlier statement from 9 March that producing the needed gear "will take months". Under article 209a of the Health Law, which was passed on 13 March and does not discriminate between offenses, failing to wear a mask in public would result in a fine of BGN 5,000 (EUR 2,555). On 31 March, Ananiev rescinded the decree, citing "a lack of public consensus" on the measure. On 6 April 2020, the National Assembly passed amendments to the State of Emergency law from 13 March. The fines for breaking the measures against the pandemic were reduced. As of 6 April, there were 1,340 fines worth approximately EUR 3,500,000 imposed, mostly for walking in the park. On 11 April, the Minister of Health reinstated the mask-wearing measure for the period 12–26 April 2020. The new decree included "towels, scarves, et al," despite reports that "[t]here is only limited indirect evidence that non-medical face masks are effective as a means of source control." On 24 April 2020, compulsory mask-wearing in public was extended to 13 May 2020, excluding open public spaces after 1 May 2020.

Nearly BGN 14,000,000 (EUR 7,160,000) had been donated by 3 April, with 48% coming from private companies, 26% from public campaigns, 19% from individual donors and 7% from foundations.

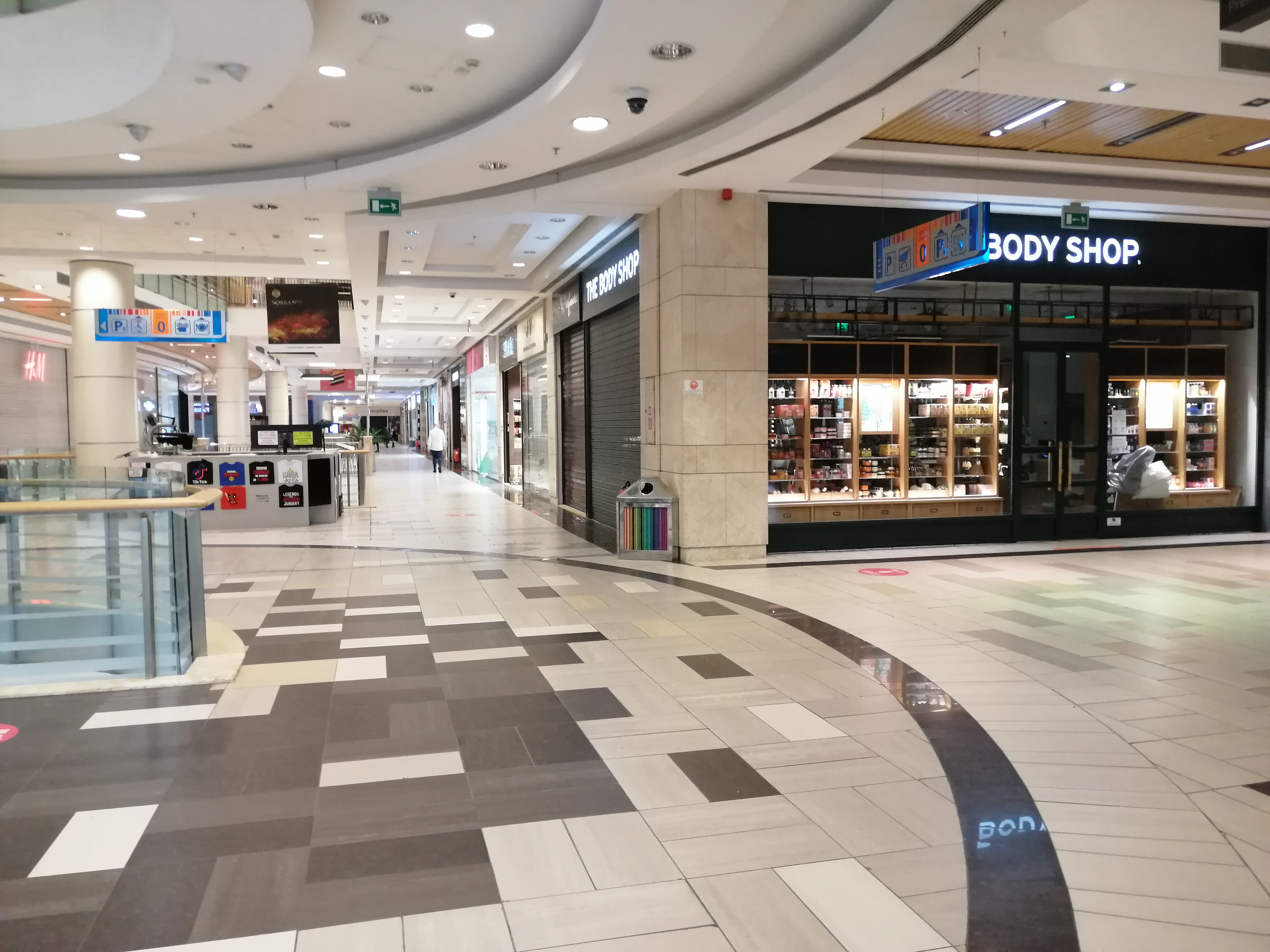
The Mall (Sofia) during the COVID-19 pandemic in Bulgaria

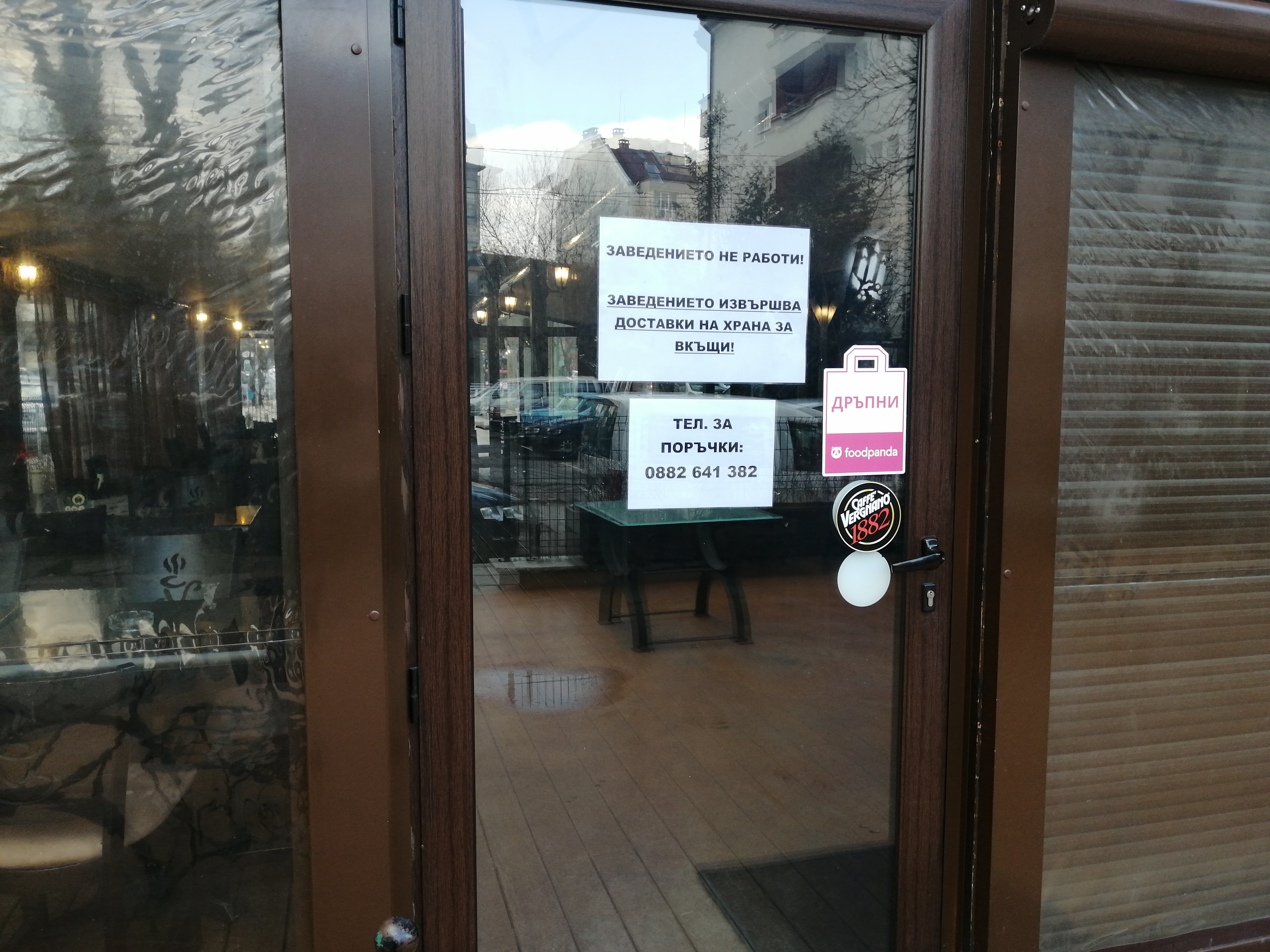
A closed restaurant in Sofia (number for home delivery of food provided) during the COVID-19 pandemic in Bulgaria

On 10 April, Sofia City Prosecutor's Office indicted Asena Stoimenova, chairwoman of the Bulgarian Pharmaceutical Union, under article 326 of the Penal Code following "a series of statements inciting fear in the population during the state of emergency." In an interview for Bulgarian National Television, Stoimenova had stated that the market for protective gear appears to be normalizing following the shortages the country experienced at the outbreak of the pandemic, but disruptions in the international pharmaceutical trade might lead to shortages of other medical supplies in Bulgaria.

When interviewed in December 2021, Ventsislav Mutafchiyski stated that Bulgaria had followed a COVID-Zero rather than a "living with COVID" strategy until 13 May 2020.

=== Testing ===
As of 24 March, there were 5 laboratories testing for COVID-19 in the country with a capacity of 300 tests per day. The total number of tests done by 26 March was 6,454, with 264 confirmed cases and a rate of infection around 4.1%.

On 27 March, the Ministry of Health announced that the country then had the capacity to process between 1,000 and 1,200 tests per day, at an estimated cost of BGN 930,000 (EUR 475,000) per month. Two additional methods of testing would be introduced at later stages of the pandemic – fluorescence immunochromatographic tests (up to 20,000 per day) and the so-called 'quick' tests (up to 40,000 per day). Major General Ventsislav Mutafchiyski called all three types "equally important", as the PCR ones provided reliable data, while the fluorescence tests could speed up the process before quick ones are applied to establish how many people have acquired immunity. However, Mutafchiyski later added that rapid tests are considered "unreliable" and therefore mass screening would be "meaningless".

Conversely, Radka Argirova, chairman of the National Expert Board in Virology at the Bulgarian Doctors' Union, urged increased rapid testing to discover asymptomatic cases, avoiding the chance of a future second peak and terminating the epidemic progression. "Aggressive, complete screening" of the population was also advocated by Rumen Hichev, a Bulgarian medical professional based in the United States and part of a medical advisor team to the White House. According to Hichev, the Bulgarian government had reacted quickly, but without mass screening to establish asymptomatic spreaders, any effort would be behind the course of events.

On 5 April, the Ministry of Health announced a total of 15,599 tests had been performed to date in eight laboratories across the country. The government announced that by 18 April, 26 417 tests had been performed.

As of October 2020, there were 65 laboratories offering PCR testing, the results of which were recognized for travel abroad.

On 22 October 2021, it was announced that the record number of 47,370 tests (both PCR and rapid antigen) had been performed over the last 24 hours, which was attributed to the introduction of the "green certificate" (obtained courtesy of a vaccination, proof of recovery from COVID-19 or a negative test) requirement for many public activities.

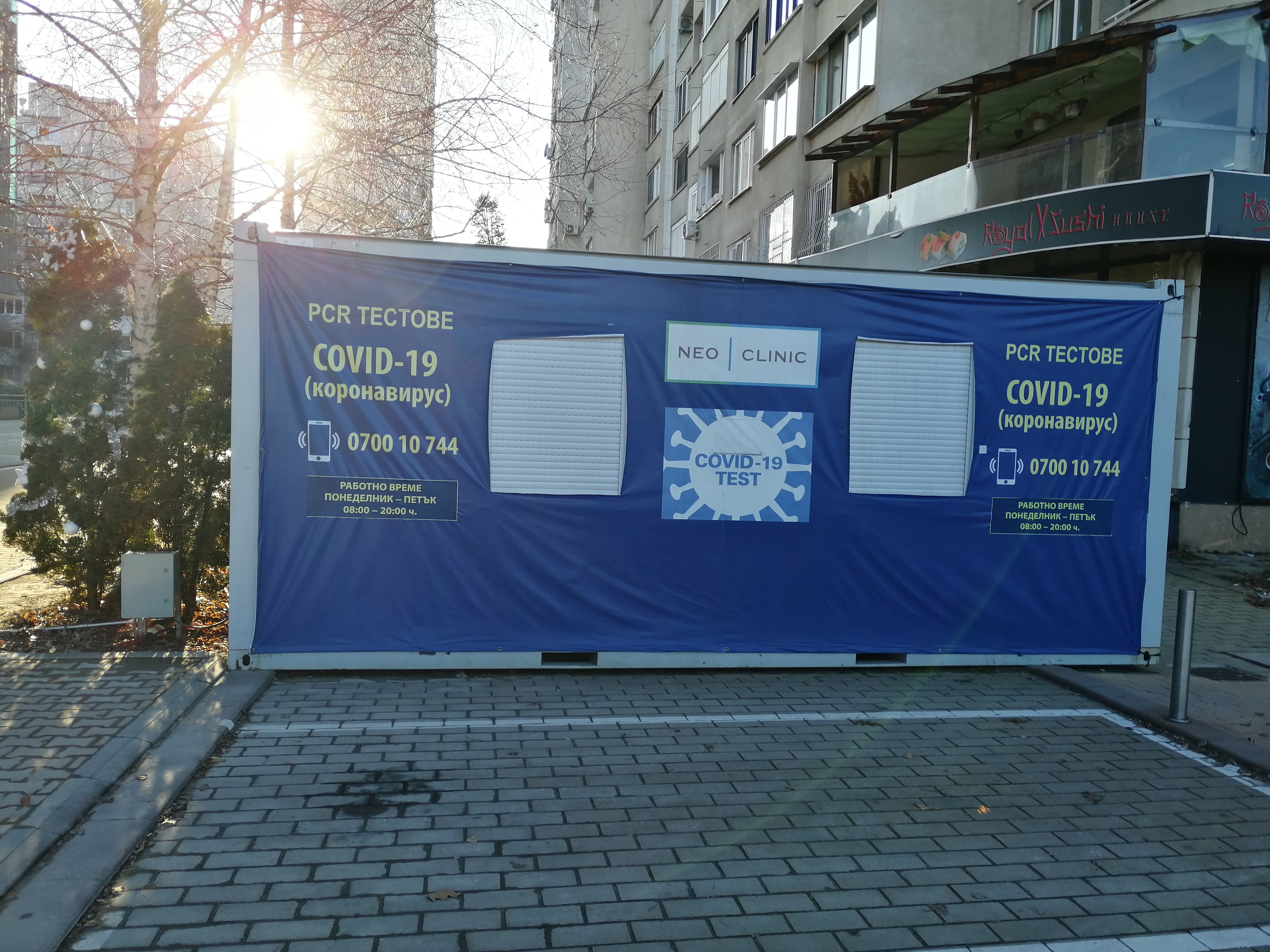
A COVID-19 testing laboratory near Iuzhen Park in Sofia.

=== Medication ===
After testing positive for COVID-19, business magnate Kiril Domuschiev announced that his company would procure chloroquine from foreign sources and donate it to the national coronavirus task force. However, chloroquine, a quinine drug, has been proven to provide no benefit for COVID-19 patients. The Bulgarian government is looking into import opportunities from China and domestic production by local pharmaceutical companies. Exports of all quinine-based drugs were prohibited until further notice, and 35,000 doses of quinine-based Metamizole for export have been diverted for domestic consumption. Another 250,000 doses of the drug can reportedly be produced on a short notice by local pharmaceutical companies. On 3 April, the government negotiated the delivery of 171,429 packs of Hydroxychloroquine sulfate and 30,000 packs of azithromycin from the China National Pharmaceutical Group. The shipment was delivered using a NATO Boeing C-17 Globemaster III piloted by a Bulgarian Air Force captain; the cargo also included more than 1,600,000 masks and 50 ventilators.

Bulgarian biotechnology company Micar21 has been developing a general coronavirus vaccine in the past four years, and announced that it will begin clinical trials of a SARS-CoV-2 vaccine based on this research in mid-2020. The company announced that with government support in funding and shorter clinical trial protocols, the drug could be synthesised in two months.

Colchicine has been offered to patients since April 2020 with some promising results, but the degree of effectiveness as well as the precise dosage remains under evaluation.

Some medical practitioners have controversially prescribed ivermectin in an off-label fashion, contrary to international medical guidelines.

=== Vaccination ===
Despite abundant vaccine supply, Bulgaria's uptake proved substantially lower than the European average, making the vaccination campaign one of the country's defining challenges throughout 2021. By November 2021, only 21.8% of the population had been fully vaccinated, the lowest proportion among the 27 European Union member states. Hesitancy extended into the medical profession: approximately 30% of Bulgarian doctors had not been vaccinated, with estimates of unvaccinated staff reaching 50% at some hospitals in Sofia. A November 2021 survey found that 52% of respondents believed COVID-19 had been artificially created, 40% considered it a conspiracy by pharmaceutical companies to generate profit, 33% regarded it as no more dangerous than ordinary influenza, and 16% believed vaccines contained microchips intended for mind control. A Gallup poll from September 2021 found that 45% of respondents were unvaccinated and had no intention of receiving a vaccine.

The epidemiological consequences of low vaccination coverage were immediately apparent. When Bulgaria introduced the green certificate requirement for restaurants, cinemas, gyms, shopping centres, hospitals and universities on 21 October 2021, the country held the highest COVID-19 mortality rate among European Union member states for the preceding two weeks, with 94% of those deaths having occurred among unvaccinated individuals.

=== Projections ===
According to research conducted by the Institute for Health Metrics and Evaluation at the University of Washington, the pandemic was expected to reach its peak in Bulgaria at the end of April. The projections were assuming full social distancing through May 2020. The research listed 856 ICU beds in the country and projected no shortage of medical resources.

=== Criticism ===
Georgi Todorov, a Bulgarian doctor with experience in viral breakouts in Ghana, criticised the handling of the COVID-19 threat. In particular, Todorov stated that Bulgaria's health administration was so rife with nepotism that it could not come up with any coherent response; as a result, infectious disease specialists were not taken into account when formulating response policies, and no specific locations were designated for potential COVID-19 cases. Todorov further assumed that infected individuals may not have been identified because of improper application of testing procedures. Following the end of the first lockdown in Bulgaria, there has been criticism due to the lack of sufficiently strict non-pharmaceutical interventions implemented by the governments.

Restaurant and hotel owners repeatedly protested against pandemic restrictions. In September 2021, hundreds of restaurateurs, hoteliers and workers from tourism, transport and entertainment venues marched through central Sofia from the National Assembly to the Ministry of Health, organised by the Association of Establishments in Bulgaria and the Bulgarian Association of Establishments; the protesters demanded compensation for lost revenue, an end to closures and operating-hour restrictions, and the resignation of Health Minister Stoycho Katsarov, giving the government until 28 September 2021 to act. Similar demonstrations, under the slogan "Business Strikes Back", were staged in Sofia, Varna and Plovdiv, with restaurateurs blocking intersections and calling for a revised crisis-management strategy that would compensate businesses for reduced seating capacity rather than imposing closures.

=== Discrimination ===
Some Roma communities, like the one in Burgas, were surveilled with thermal drone cameras. Other communities, from places like Yambol or Kyustendil, were sprayed with disinfectants from helicopters and crop dusters. Ognyan Isaev, a Roma activist, expressed concerns that if the pandemic worsened, discriminatory measures could be reinstated.

=== Economy ===
The Bulgarian government enacted a series of measures aimed at reducing the economic impact of the COVID-19 pandemic on businesses and individuals.

==== 60/40 measure ====
The so-called "60/40 measure" is a short-term instrument to help businesses retain their employees during the COVID-19 crisis. The state will cover 60% of employees' insurable earnings, as well as the social insurance contributions owed by the employer. The measure is in effect for the duration of the State of Emergency announced on 13 March 2020, but for no longer than 3 months. Within its first three months, the scheme paid out roughly 88 million BGN in compensation to over 7,600 enterprises, preserving around 205,000 jobs, with tourism and retail the most represented sectors; the measure was subsequently extended with revised terms from 1 July 2020. By April 2022, some 13,646 companies had drawn on the measure, preserving an estimated 331,518 jobs, with a cumulative 1.845 billion BGN disbursed since its introduction.

==== State-backed interest-free loans program for individuals ====
The program provides state-backed, interest-free, zero-fee loans to individuals, deprived of the opportunity to work as an effect of the COVID-19 pandemic. The program is implemented by the Bulgarian Development Bank in partnership with a number of banks from the private sector.

Self-employed individuals and individuals under an employment contract are eligible for an interest-free loan of up to 4,500 BGN (2,300 EUR), with a grace period between six and twenty-four months, paid out in three monthly installments of 1,500 BGN. By late July 2020, over 21,000 applications had been submitted through ten partner banks, with roughly half approved and an average loan size of about 4,000 BGN; two of the participating banks had already exhausted their allocated funds.

==== Working capital loans for SMEs ====
The program, financed by the Bulgarian Development Bank, provides working capital loans of up to 300,000 BGN, aiming to provide liquidity to SMEs affected by the COVID-19 pandemic. Backed by a 500 million BGN fund, the scheme guaranteed up to 80% of a partner bank's risk on each loan and allowed for up to three years of deferral on principal or interest payments; eligible businesses had to employ fewer than 250 people and demonstrate a revenue decline, unpaid receivables, cancelled export contracts or facility closures linked to the pandemic.

==== Grants for small and micro-enterprises ====
Small and micro-enterprises are eligible for state grants between 3,000 and 10,000 BGN, calculated as 10% of the applicant's 2019 revenue, provided they have reported at least 20% drop in monthly revenue compared to the same month in 2019. The grants, administered through the Operational Programme "Innovation and Competitiveness" 2014–2020, were open to applicants registered before 1 January 2019 with at least 30,000 BGN in 2019 revenue and no outstanding tax or municipal arrears; the application window ran from 11 to 30 May 2020 on a first-come, first-served basis.

==== Moratorium on loan repayments ====
The board of directors of the Bulgarian National Bank established a private moratorium on loans repayments, as presented by The Association of Banks in Bulgaria, which allows for payments deferral of up to six months. The relief covered obligations to banks and their leasing subsidiaries, excluded so-called fast loans from non-bank lenders, left interest rates unchanged, and could be applied for until 22 June 2020.

== Impact ==
Bulgaria recorded 31,643 newly registered unemployed from 13 March to 1 April. From these, 17,793 claimants stated that job losses were a direct consequence of the pandemic, and 12,661 registered in the week 23–27 March alone, compared to 4,561 for the same period in 2019. The number of unemployed continued to rise throughout April. According to a statistic released by the Agency of Employment, as of 28 April 2020, there were 291,426 registered unemployed, a rise of 90,405 since the introduction of the national emergency. A survey conducted by the Bulgarian Industrial Association showed that initially only 8% of the companies were willing to use the government stimulus package, which quickly became colloquially known as 'the 60/40 measure'. The proposal envisions the government paying 60% of the impacted businesses' employee wages for up to three months, as long as the companies refrain from lay-offs.

== Views of the general public ==
A Gallup opinion poll from April 2020 revealed that 77% of the citizens expressed support for the lockdown-related pandemic control measures taken by the authorities in the country. A "Trend" survey between 1 and 5 April 2020 saw 35% demand stronger measures against COVID-19, 39% rating the government policies as sufficiently strict and 23% expressing the opinion that the pandemic controls need to be relaxed. A nation-wide opinion sampling of 1,151 adult Bulgarian citizens conducted by the Bulgarian Academy of Sciences, the University of National and World Economy, Bulgarian Sociological Association and the Union of Economists of Bulgaria in mid-2021 showed that the support for a "stay-at-home" order was 60%, with 75% approving of mask mandates and 74% agreeing with bans on public gatherings. According to a Eurobarometer poll conducted between March and April 2021 82% of Bulgarians expressed a wish that the European Union acquires enhanced prerogatives in handling crises such as the COVID-19 pandemic.

== Assessments ==
An April 2022 academic paper characterized Bulgaria as "perhaps the most heavily affected" Eastern European country in terms of excess mortality data, with the late imposition of restrictions on social mobility and the insufficient government control deemed likely to be the major factors behind this statistic. The authors also highlighted the generally better health outcomes in major population centers as opposed to more peripheral regions of the country. The same study estimated approximately 19,004 excess deaths in Bulgaria during 2020, yielding an excess mortality rate of around 2,734 deaths per million population, the highest recorded among Eastern European countries examined and among the highest in the European Union. Excess deaths in 2020 exceeded the officially reported COVID-19 death toll by roughly 2.5 times, a gap reflecting both diagnostic shortfalls and fatalities attributable to the disruption of routine medical care. Working-age adults aged 15 to 64 accounted for approximately 21% of all excess deaths; women aged 40 to 64 exhibited disproportionately elevated mortality, a pattern the authors tentatively associated with cluster outbreaks in textile manufacturing plants. In early November 2021, the World Health Organization reported that Bulgaria ranked third in the world in COVID-19 deaths per 100,000 population for the week of 30 October to 5 November 2021. The high degree of income inequality in Bulgaria has been associated with corruption and lack of institutional trust, contributing to many issues with the country's response to the pandemic.

== See also ==
- COVID-19 pandemic by country and territory
- COVID-19 pandemic in Europe
