= Mutafchiyski =

Mutafchiyski is a Bulgarian surname. Notable people with the surname include:

- Radko Mutafchiyski (born 1989), Bulgarian footballer
- Ventsislav Mutafchiyski (born 1964), Bulgarian military doctor
