= Military Medical Academy (Bulgaria) =

Geography
- Location: Sofia, Bulgaria

Organisation
- Type: Military hospital; medical research and training centre
- Affiliated university: Bulgarian Ministry of Defence

Services
- Beds: 283

History
- Founded: 19 November 1891

Links
- Website: www.vma.bg
- Lists: Hospitals in Bulgaria

The Military Medical Academy (Военномедицинска академия, romanized: Voennomeditsinska akademiya; abbreviated VMA) is a military hospital, medical research institution, and academic training centre in Sofia, Bulgaria. It operates under the Bulgarian Ministry of Defence and treats both military personnel and civilian patients through Bulgaria's national health insurance system. The main hospital is at "Tsar Simeon" Street №3 in Sofia. Four branch hospitals, in Varna, Plovdiv, Pleven, and Sliven, operate under the academy's administration, along with balneology and rehabilitation centres in Hisar, Pomorie, and Bankya.

The academy has 283 beds and runs 32 clinics and departments across more than 30 medical specialties.

== History ==
=== Founding and early years (1891–1918) ===
The academy's own history states that it was founded on 19 November 1891 under Decree No. 439, as the Sofia General Garrison Hospital (Обща гарнизонна болница – София), with Dr. Hristo Popovichev as its first director. Several other sources, including the International Military Medicine Almanac and health-directory profiles of the academy, instead name Dr. Georgi Zlatovich (also transliterated Zolotovich) as the founding director. The academy today marks its anniversary each year on 1 December, which is 19 November under the Julian calendar Bulgaria used before 1916.

During the Balkan Wars (1912–1913) the hospital's staff grew to 18 teachers, 8 assistant doctors, and 57 students, reflecting the wartime demand for military medical personnel. The hospital's role continued through World War I (1915–1918), with medical missions from Germany, Austria, and Hungary assisting Bulgarian staff.

Bulgarian military medics have taken part in missions abroad since 1904, when Bulgaria sent its first humanitarian medical mission to Manchuria.

=== Interwar period and reorganisation (1918–1960) ===
Between the two world wars the hospital changed its institutional form and name several times, in line with broader military reforms, but stayed based in Sofia. The March 1949 formation of the People's Military Medical School and its 1958 closure, and the 1960 restoration of a Higher Military Medical Institute (HMMI), are documented in secondary sources but the academy's own site does not give full details of this period.

=== Establishment of the Military Medical Academy (1989) ===
On 6 April 1989, State Council Decree №546 created the Military Medical Academy by merging the Higher Military Medical Institute with the Unified Aeromedical Research Institute, the Naval Hospital in Varna, and the Government Hospital in Sofia. The decree took effect the following day.

In 1990, an emergency medicine unit was created and the academy was brought into the national civilian healthcare system, so that non-military patients could be treated there.

== Structure ==
=== Main hospital and branches ===
The main hospital in Sofia has 283 beds and 32 clinics and departments. The four branch hospitals are in Varna ("Tsar Alexander Batenberg" Street №3), Plovdiv ("Tsar Boris" Street №81), Pleven, and Sliven. Balneology and rehabilitation centres operate in Hisar, Pomorie, and Bankya.

=== Specialised institutes and centres ===
The academy includes several specialised units: the Centre of Military Medical Expertise and Aviation Medicine, the Centre of Military Epidemiology and Hygiene, the Research Institute of Radiobiology and NBC Protection in the Ovcha Kupel district of Sofia, and a Mental Health and Prevention Laboratory.

In 2018 the academy established an International Reference Centre for Southeast Europe, described by the academy as the only facility of its kind in the region.

== Medical services ==
=== Clinical specialties ===
A gynaecology clinic was set up in 1998, after women were formally admitted into the Bulgarian Armed Forces, and became an independent department in 2004. A hepato-pancreatic and transplant surgery clinic was established in 2003.

=== Transplant surgery ===
The academy's liver transplant programme began in 2007 under Prof. Nikola Vladov. On 23 April 2024 the programme completed its 100th liver transplant, a procedure between a 59-year-old donor and a 49-year-old recipient. Prof. Vladov said the results were "fully comparable with other centers" after 17 years of consistent outcomes, and noted that Bulgaria performs far fewer transplants per year than countries such as Spain, Croatia, and Slovenia.

By late 2025 the academy's transplant surgeons had also carried out the first kidney transplantations at the institution.

On 13 August 2026, surgeons at the academy performed the first combined liver-kidney transplant carried out in Bulgaria. Both the donor and the recipient were 20 years old. The liver transplant took about five hours and the kidney transplant about four hours.

=== Robotic surgery ===
The academy acquired a robotic surgery system for abdominal, urological, gynaecological, and thoracic procedures, part of more than 30 million leva invested in equipment during 2024. Using its da Vinci robotic system, the academy performed 305 robotic surgeries in 2025. The academy has said it plans to buy two more surgical robots, a new trauma system, and a next-generation photon scanner in 2026.

== Research and education ==
=== Research output ===
Academy-affiliated researchers have produced more than 800 scientific publications and organised more than 400 international scientific events. As of late 2024, 173 researchers were listed as affiliated with the institution on ResearchGate.

In 2021 the U.S. Office of Defense Cooperation donated an anti-SARS-CoV-2 ELISA automatic analyser, worth about 50,000 leva, to the academy's virology laboratory, through the EUCOM Humanitarian Assistance programme. The equipment was received by Maj. Gen. Prof. Ventsislav Mutafchiyski and Col. Assoc. Prof. Metodi Kunchev, head of the virology laboratory.

=== Simulation training ===
A Military Medical Simulation Training Centre opened on 3 September 2021. President Rumen Radev called it "a huge investment in the future of our Armed Forces" at the opening. The centre has two training zones, one for combat-casualty care and evacuation and one for field medical operations, plus five teaching halls.

The centre runs a combat first-aid programme known as the "platinum 10 minutes," named for what the centre's head, Dr. Nikolay Vulov, describes as the first and most decisive minutes after an injury. Between 2021 and 2025 the centre trained 1,299 people across 94 courses, including 521 people in 2025 alone.

In February 2024 the centre hosted a multinational NATO and U.S. medical training exercise. In July 2026, representatives of the Tennessee National Guard visited the centre as part of the U.S. State Partnership Program, observing casualty-evacuation training and discussing further cooperation on military medical capabilities.

=== Academic programmes ===
The academy runs a six-year degree programme for military doctors, called "Medical Support for the Armed Forces," jointly with the Medical University of Varna and the Nikola Vaptsarov Naval Academy. The programme was launched around 2016. A four-year military nursing programme and a paramedic programme are run together with the Professional Sergeants' College.

=== Balkan Military Medical Committee ===
The academy founded the Balkan Military Medical Committee in 1995. The committee brings together military medical institutions from six countries in the Balkan region.

== International operations ==
The academy has sent more than 6,000 medical personnel on more than 30 international military and humanitarian missions over its history. Since 1999, more than 960 military medics have taken part in humanitarian operations abroad, and over the last 20 years about 1,000 military doctors and nurses have served in NATO and EU operations and in disaster response at home and abroad.

As of 2025, academy personnel were deployed on three continents at once: with KFOR in Kosovo, with an EU training mission in Mali, and in Bosnia and Herzegovina. One deployed medic, Lt. Dr. Dilyara Marinova, spent four months in Bamako, Mali, supporting the medical needs of mission headquarters staff. Academy personnel have also taken part in Antarctic expeditions.

The academy maintains a mobile field hospital able to operate at NATO Role 2E or Role 3 level and stay self-sufficient for up to 12 weeks. Six aeromedical evacuation teams work in coordination with Krumovo Air Force Base.

== Leadership ==
Maj. Gen. Prof. Ventsislav Mutafchiyski has been director of the academy since 7 February 2018; he was formally presented in the post on 16 February 2018. Born on 20 August 1964 in Dupnitsa, he graduated as a doctor from the Medical University of Sofia in 1989 and joined the army the same year. He specialised in general surgery in 1996 and in military surgery in 2005, earned a doctorate in 2011, and became a professor of surgery in 2015. He headed the academy's surgery department from 2014 and was deputy head of the academy the same year, before becoming acting head in 2017 and permanent director in 2018. He was promoted from brigadier general to major general on 6 May 2019.

During his tenure Mutafchiyski has been credited with clearing more than 14 million euros of debt the hospital had built up. He has deployed to Afghanistan and Iraq, where he treated Bulgarian and other NATO soldiers as well as civilians with abdominal wounds, and he volunteered at a Burgas hospital after the 2012 Burgas airport bombing.

From 24 February 2020, Mutafchiyski chaired Bulgaria's National Crisis-management Staff during the COVID-19 pandemic in Bulgaria and became the public face of the country's pandemic response through daily briefings. He later said that only sectors such as restaurants, hotels, and schools were closed during the pandemic, while factories stayed open, and that Bulgaria's limited hospital capacity made the response harder to manage.

== Anniversary events ==
The academy marks its founding each year on 1 December. At the 133rd anniversary, in December 2024, the academy reported that its clinics had treated 55,000 patients, carried out 200,000 outpatient consultations, and performed 27,000 operations since the start of 2024; 30 clinics had been renovated and about 30 million leva spent on medical equipment during the year. Forty-six staff members and 16 military medical students were given awards at the ceremony. Then-caretaker Prime Minister Dimitar Glavchev said at the ceremony that he had told the finance ministry the defence budget should be kept above 2% of GDP.

At the 134th anniversary, in December 2025, the academy reported 521 people trained at the Simulation Training Centre during the year and 305 robotic surgeries performed with its da Vinci system, alongside the completion of its first kidney transplants and renovations of the Sliven surgery clinic and the Varna naval hospital's operating theatre.
