= Aron Aronov =

Bulgarian tenor (1937–2022)

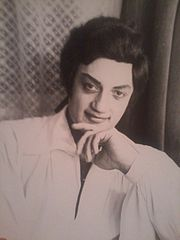
- Born: 12 July 1937; Dupnica, Bulgaria
- Died: 15 July 2022 (aged 85); Sofia, Bulgaria
- Occupation: Tenor

Aron Sabat Aronov (12 July 1937 – 15 July 2022) was a Bulgarian tenor and vocal pedagogue.

== Early years ==
Aron Aronov was born on 12 July 1937 to a Bulgarian Jewish family in Dupnica, Bulgaria. As a student he played sports, chess and was interested in music. He became a regional champion at 100 meter smooth running for adolescents, came second in the city chess tournament, and second at the adolescents table tennis tournament in Dupnica. As a student in Dupnica he performed in his first operettas, “Zaporozhets za Dunayem” (Dunaevski), “Die Csárdásfürstin” (E. Kalman), and “La belle Hélène” with dirigent Veneta Vitcheva. He graduated from the Bulgarian National Academy of Music with opera singing and master class with the famous vocal pedagogue Hriso Brumbarov (teacher of Ghena Dimitrova, Nicolai Ghiaurov, Nikola Ghiuselev, and Dimitar Uzunov).

== Career ==
Aron’s professional debut was in 1965 in Varna’s Opera as Alfredo in “La traviata”. Then performances in Sofia follow in the Sofia’s Opera as Manrico in “Il trovatore” with Alexandrina Milcheva (mezzo-soprano), Stefka Evstatieva (soprano), and Nikolay Smocievski (baritone), and as Ernani in “Ernani” with Yulia Viner, and Števa Buryja in Jenůfa.

During the same time (1965) he became a member of the National Musical Theater “Stefan Makedonski” - Sofia, where he continued the tenor tradition of Lubomir Bodurov and Minko Bosev. He performed all of the main tenor parts.

His predebit is in "My Fair Lady" as Freddie, and his debut part is Ange-Pitou from the French opera "La fille de Madame Angot".

In the period from 1965 to 2007, Aron Aronov was a main artist in the National Musical Theater “Stefan Makedonski”.

After the end of his stage career he started teaching voice.

Aron Aronov - Tasilo in "Countess Maritza"

Works with:

- The directors Mihail Hadjimishev, Petyr Shtarbanov, Boris Pokrovsky, Leon Daniel, Gec Purvanov, Bogdan Kovachev, Plamen Kartalov, Rumen Neikov, Vidin Daskalov, Kuzman Popov and others.
- The conductors Rosica Batalova, Radosveta Boiadjieva, Michael Angelov, Jule Levi, Nedialko Nedialkov, Boris Hinchev, Ruslan Raichev, Grigor Palikarov, Metodi Matakiev, Nayden Todorov, Anton Guadagno and others.
- The painters Mariana Popova, Salvatore Russo and others.

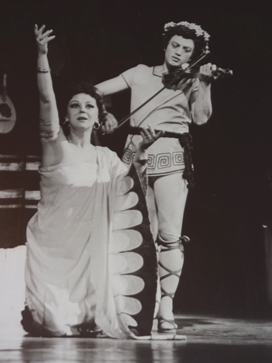
Aron Aronov in "Orpheus in the Underworld"

Co-stars:

- In the operetta: Aneta Tsankova, Tinka Kraeva, Liliana Koshlukova, Bojana Prodeva, Diana Popova, Liliana Kisiova, Anelia Shumanova, Donka Shishmanova, Hermina Mihailova, Mariana Koceva, Zorka Dimitrova, Sabina Tiankova, Svetlana Ivanova, Dobrina Ikonomova, Tsvetelina Vasileva, Vidin Daskalov, Minko Bosev, Hrisand Buchvarov, Veselin Damianov, Ognimir Pavlov, Stoian Dimitrov, Lubo Avramov and others.
- In the opera - Ghena Dimitrova, Alexandrina Miltcheva, Raina Kabaivanska, Anna Tomowa-Sintow, Stefka Evstatieva, Julia Viner, Stefka Mineva, Nikola Ghiuselev, Nikolay Smochevski, Nikola Nikolov, Rumen Doikov, Zhivko Pranchev, Niko Isakov, Franco Giovine, Nelson Portela and others.

== Repertoire ==
For his forty five years of work Aron Aronov has acted as Edvin from Die Csárdásfürstin 975 times and as Feri von Kerekes from the same play 134 times. There are many other characters he played: Count Danilo from The Merry Widow, Count Tasilo from Countess Maritza, Adam from The Bird Seller, Eisenstein, Falke, Alfred from The Bath, Barinkay and Homonay from The Gypsy Baron; Paris, Achille, and Calchas from La belle Hélène; Paganini from Paganini. Su Chong from The Land of Smiles, became a sensation and was talked about for ages after.

Part of his repertoire are the main roles in Das Veilchen vom Montmartre, The Prince of Madrid, La Périchole, The Beautiful Galatea, Andalusia, Orpheus in the Underworld, Bluebeard, and many others.

He participates in Bulgarian operettas also. He plays Mladen and Minko from "A revolution song" (Georgy Cherkin), Kir Spiridone from "The Knight", llia from "Crazy Gidia" (Parashkev Hadziev), the scientist from "The Shadow" (Victor Raichev).

Torn between his love for operas and operettas, Aron Aronov participates in two premieres in one day, which started at almost the same time. He starts as Shultz from Cabarett in the Musical Theater, and after the final of the play and some running he turns into The priest of Neptune from Idomeneo in National opera of Sofia. For the roles of Spoletta in "Tosca", The Abbe in "Andrea Chenie", Pang in "Turandot", Ruiz in "Il trovatore", Normanno in "Lucia di Lammermoor", Ovlur in "Prince Igor", Third Jew in "Salome", Aron Aronov is called "The king of the small roles".

== Personal life and death ==
Aron Aronov marries Zdravka Pisareva. They have a daughter, Sabina. Sabina A. Wien is currently the Dean of Students at the American University in Bulgaria (AUBG). Aron Aronov has a grandson named Martin Wien

Aronov died on 15 July 2022, at the age of 85.

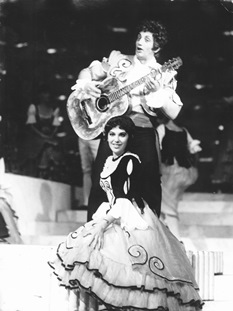
Aron Aronov in "La Périchole"

== Discography ==
During his active years Aaron makes many audio and video records for the Bulgarian National Radio (BNR) and the Bulgarian National Television (BNT). Because of the copyright laws during the time of the recordings, they are property of BNR and BNT. Part of the recordings have been released on CD, but most of them are part of the two institutions’ collections.

- CD - "Die Fledermaus"
- CD - "Die Csárdásfürstin"
- CD - "La Périchole"
- CD - "Countess Maritza"
- CD - Operetta
