= Dupnitsa =

Dupnitsa Дупница
- Town
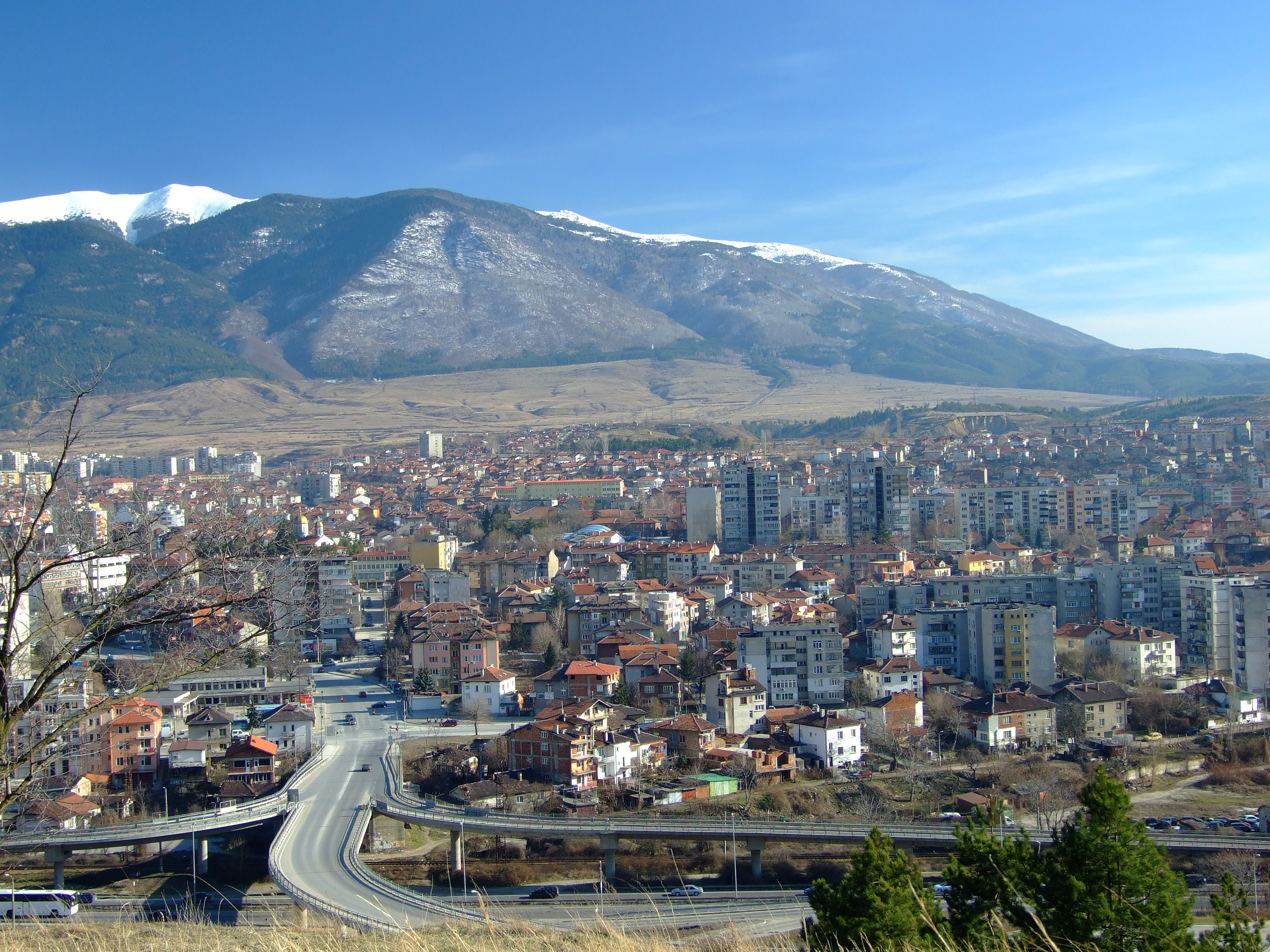
- Dupnitsa in front of the highest mountain in Southeastern Europe - the Rila Mountain

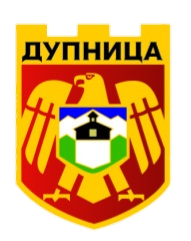
- Coat of arms

- Location of Dupnitsa
- Coordinates: 42.2645°N 23.1164°E
- Country: Bulgaria
- Province (Oblast): Kyustendil Province

Government
  - Mayor: Parvan Dangov (BSP)

Area
  - Town: 32.321 km^{2} (12.479 sq mi)
- Elevation: 535 m (1,755 ft)

Population 2021
  - Town: 28,333
  - Density: 876.61/km^{2} (2,270.4/sq mi)
  - Urban: 42,470
- Time zone: UTC+2 (EET)
  - Summer (DST): UTC+3 (EEST)
- Postal Code: 2600
- Area code: 0701
- Website: www.dupnitsa.bg

Dupnitsa, or Dupnica (Bulgarian: Дупница (previously Дубница), pronounced [ˈdupnit͡sɐ]), is a town in Western Bulgaria. It is at the foot of the highest mountains in the Balkan Peninsula – the Rila Mountains, and about 50 km (31 mi) south of the capital Sofia. Dupnitsa is the second largest town in Kyustendil Province.

== History ==
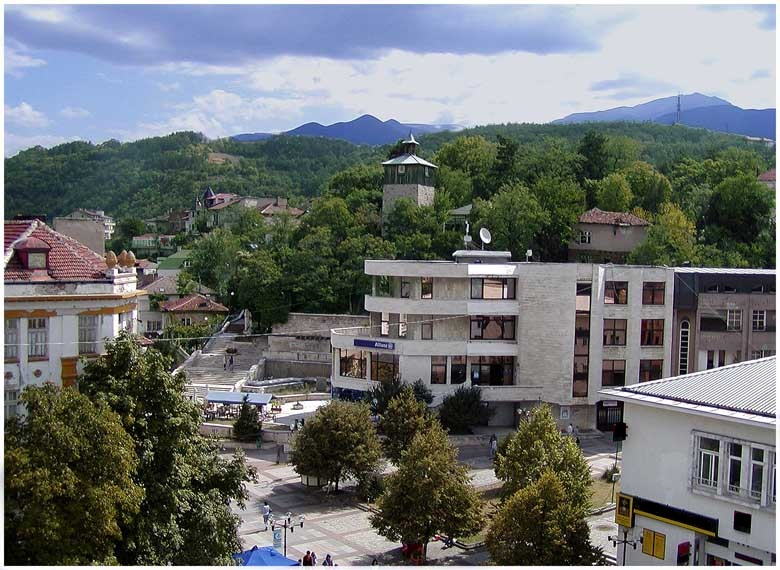
View of the clock tower in Dupnitsa, built in the 17th century

The town has existed since ancient times. The German traveller Arnold von Harff visited Dupnitsa in 1499 and described it as a "beautiful town". The names Tobinitsa, Doupla and Dubnitsa are mentioned throughout history, the last one used until the Liberation of Bulgaria, when the official name was changed to Dupnitsa. In 1948 the town was renamed Stanke Dimitrov; for a short period in 1949 it was called Marek; the name was changed to Stanke Dimitrov in 1950. After the democratic changes, the old name Dupnitsa was restored.

On 15 October 1902, around 600 women and children fled to the vicinity of Dupnitsa from Macedonia from the attacking Turkish troops.

On a hill overlooking the town there is a giant cross, commemorating the Bulgarians who perished in the Balkan Wars and World War I. On the same hill there lay the ruins of a medieval fortress.

During World War II over 4,000 Jews from parts of Greece and Yugoslavia annexed by Bulgaria were arrested on 4 March 1943 and deported, some to an internment camp in Dupnitsa. Many of them were from Komotini and Xanthi. After 11 to 12 days in the Dupnitsa camp, on 18 – 19 March they were transferred by train to Lom on the Danube for extermination at Treblinka. As part of the Bulgarian Commissariat for Jewish Affairs's policy of deporting Jews, Dupnitsa also was between June 1943 and September 1944 the site of a ghetto for 1,624 Jews expelled from Sofia, even though there was ultimately no exterminations of Jews resident within Bulgaria's pre-war borders.

Nowadays Dupnitsa is a fast-developing town combining new buildings with modern architecture with its historical monuments. Because of its scenic location at the foot of the Rila mountain, the town is a popular holiday destination. One of the main branches of industry is the pharmaceutical company Actavis (formerly HeFeKa, in Bulgarian ХФК), which gives employment to about 30 to 40 percent of the citizens. Small business is developing rapidly due to the town's economic growth.

Dupnitsa is famous for its cultural festivals. From 1 May to 2 June many festivals are held in the town due to the richness of the Bulgarian holiday calendar. The nightlife is very well developed. There are a lot of local pubs and clubs where young people meet and have fun. A few other popular places for socializing are the recently refurbished Town Park and the Town Garden (Градска градина, Gradska gradina).

In recent years the town has become notorious due to the activities of an organised crime group led by pair of Bulgarian gangsters, former policemen Angel Hristov and Plamen Galev, known as the "Galevi brothers". Using intimidation and extortion, and with the help of corrupt policemen, they controlled Dupnitsa to the extent that they have been described as "the owners of the first private town in Bulgaria". Hristov and Galev are fugitives after having been sentenced to five and four years respectively but are still believed to control the town.

== Population ==
According to the 2021 census, the population of Dupnitsa is 28,333 people.

=== Ethnic linguistic and religious composition ===
1. Bulgarians (86.8%)
2. Roma (6.96%)
3. Undeclared (5.92%)
4. Others (0.62%)

According to the 2011 census data, ethnic identity was distributed as follows:

- Bulgarians: 29,099 (92.0%)
- Roma: 2,333 (7.4%)
- Others: 102 (0.3%)
- Indefinable: 106 (0.3%)
  - Undeclared: 1,879 (5.9%)

Total: 33,519

Some Aromanians live in Dupnitsa. An Aromanian cultural organization is present in the town.

== Sport ==
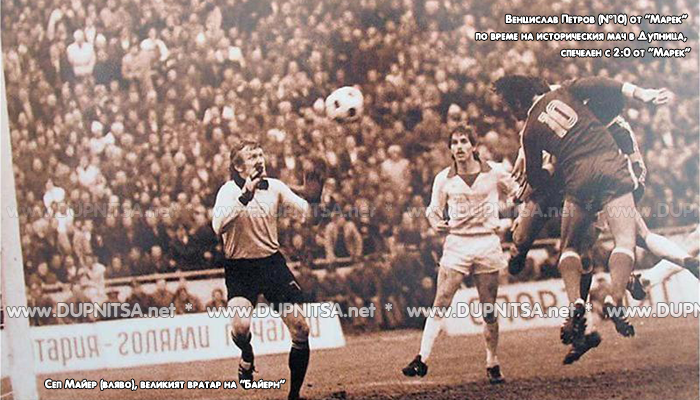
Picture of the UEFA Cup match PFC Marek Dupnitsa 2:0 FC Bayern Munich.

Marek Dupnitsa is the football club representing the town. Marek was a dominant force in Bulgarian football in the mid-late 1970s, finishing 3rd in the domestic league, and winning the National Cup. The team played with success in Europe, defeating at home powerhouses such as Bayern Munich, Aberdeen and Ferencvaros.

The Volleyball club Marek Union - Ivkoni is from the town. Dupnitsa also has strong traditions in chess, kick-boxing, baseball.

== Name ==
The names Tobinitsa, Doupla and Dubnitsa are used throughout its history. Dubnitsa survived until the Liberation of Bulgaria, when the official name was changed to Dupnitsa. In 1948 the town was renamed Stanke Dimitrov; in 1949 it was called Marek; the name was once again changed to Stanke Dimitrov in 1950. After the "democratic changes", the name Dupnitsa was restored.

Dupnitsa is located at an altitude of 500 m in a valley, surrounded by hills. Its location, as seen from above, resembles a hole (дупка, dupka in Bulgarian), hence the name Dupnitsa. There are five rivers flowing in the vicinity.

Dupnitsa is referred to as "The Green and Shady Town", because of its location which makes it quite shady in summer and due to the abundance of trees in the town. Dupnitsa is called "The Little Italy of Bulgaria". This nickname comes from the fact that many inhabitants have gone over the years to work and live in Italy and every summer they return to their home town (see: Bulgarians in Italy). Another nickname of the town is "the town of pharmacy".

== Sister cities ==
- Bryansk, Russia

== Honour ==
Dupnitsa Point on Smith Island, South Shetland Islands is named after Dupnitsa.

== Gallery ==
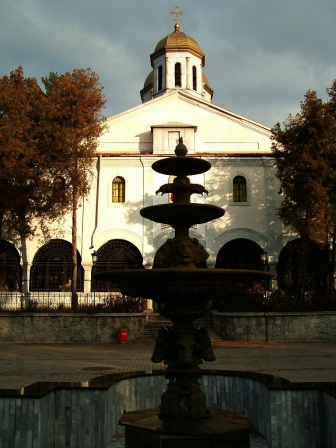
St. George Orthodox Church in Dupnitsa

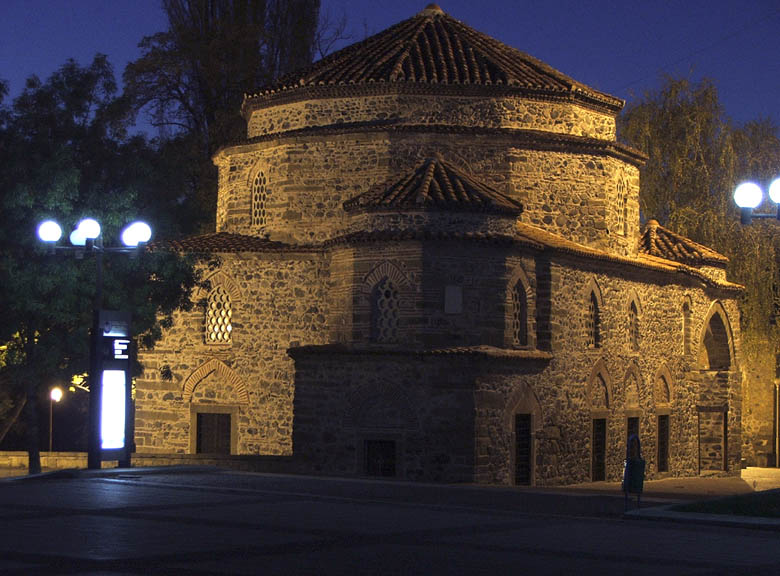
The gallery in Dupnitsa seen in the night, former mosque, built on the foundations of an Orthodox church

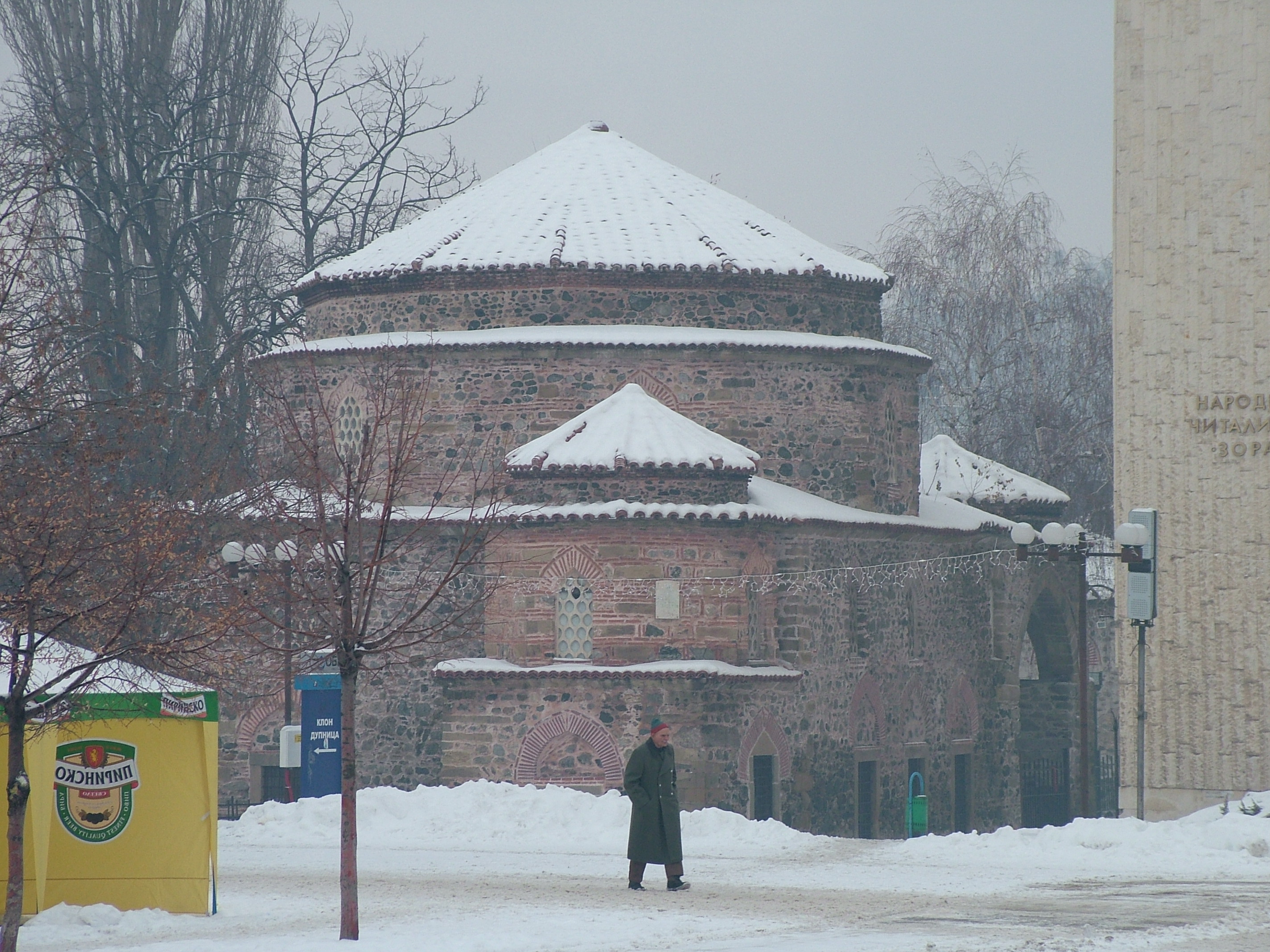
The gallery in Dupnitsa seen in winter, former mosque, built on the foundations of an Orthodox church

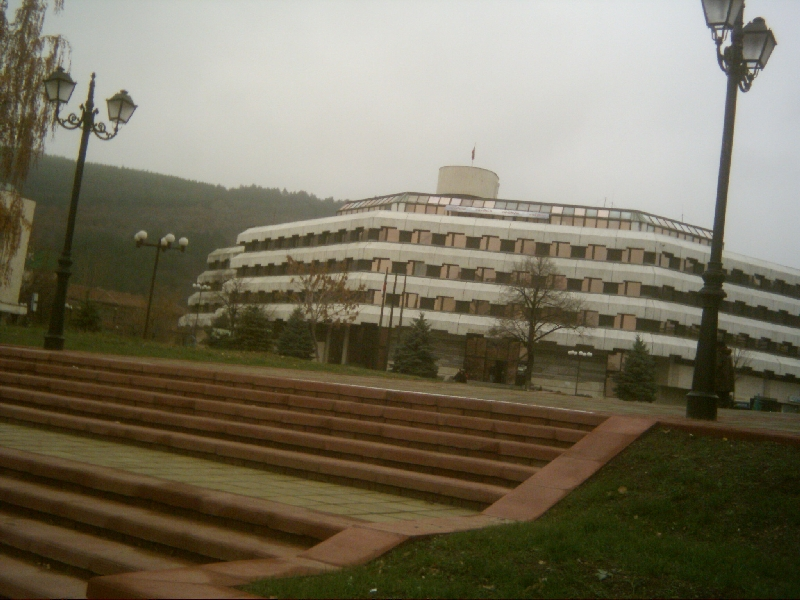
The town hall of Dupnitsa

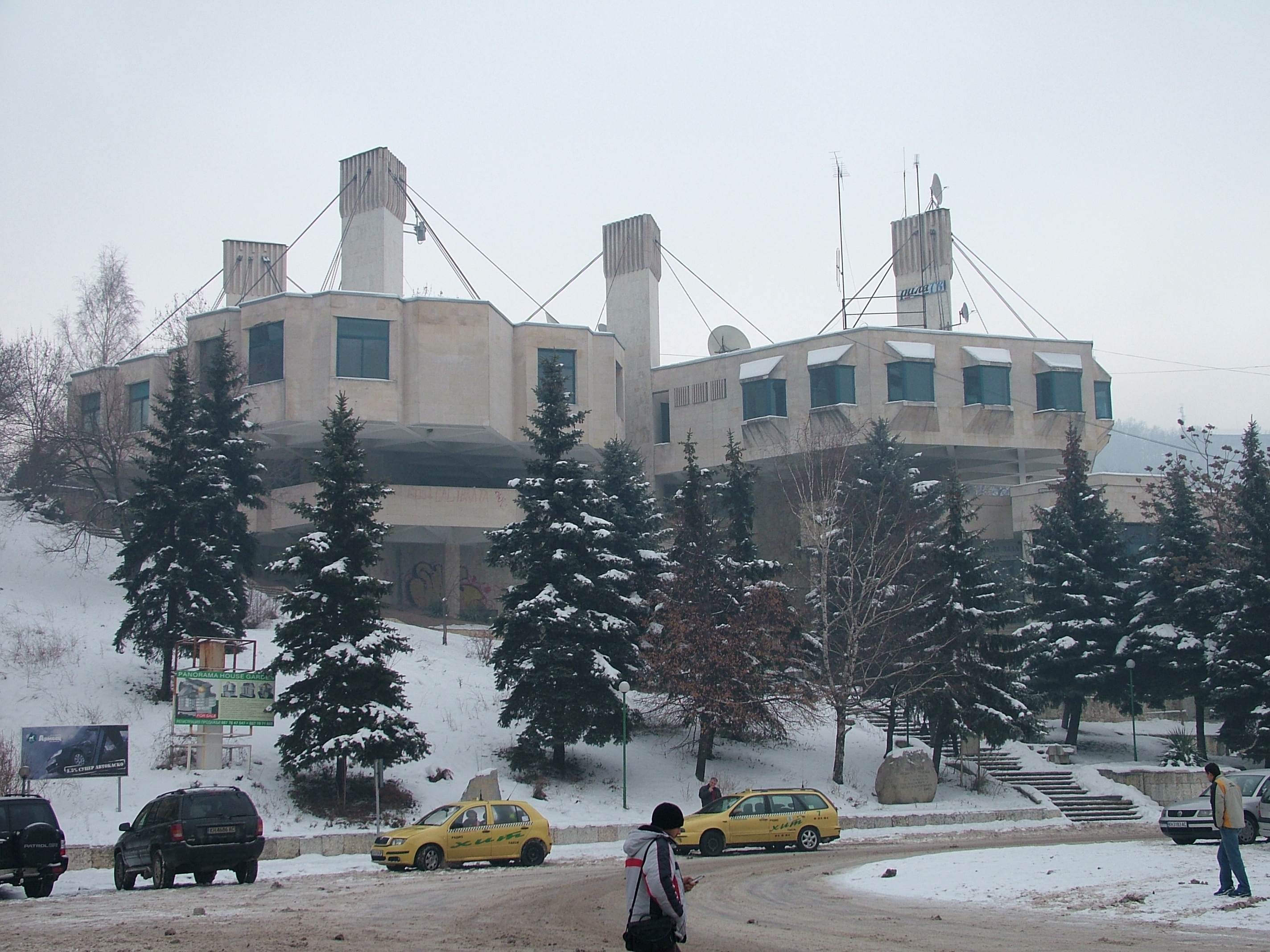
Dupnitsa's Youth Home in winter

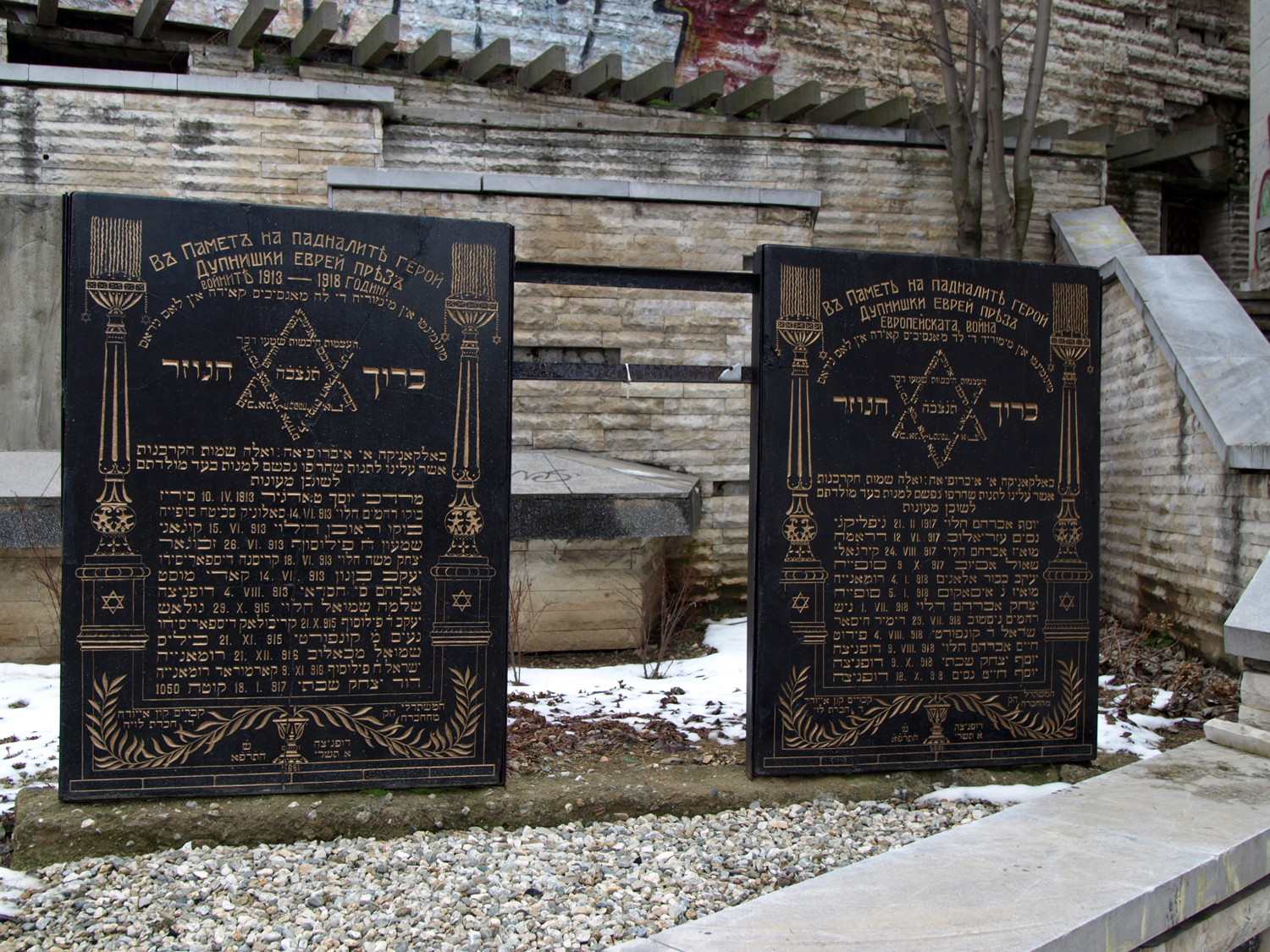
Memorial to the Jewish soldiers from Dupnitsa

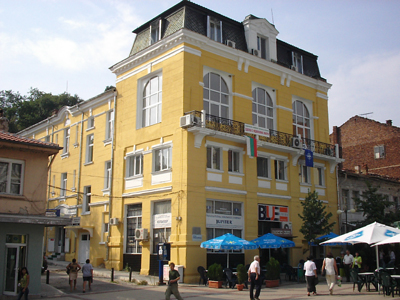
Dupnitsa centre

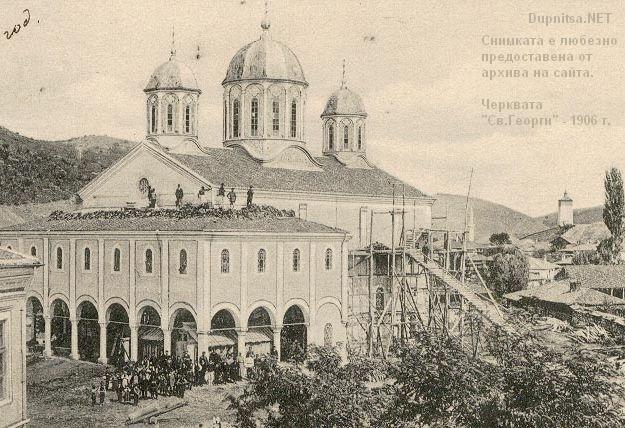
St. George Orthodox Church in 1906.

== Notable people ==
- Abraham Alkalai (c. 1750-1811), Bulgarian rabbi
- Ana Maleshevska (1871–1942) – Bulgarian teacher, revolutionary and political activist
- Aaron Aaronov - opera singer;
- Asen Tcholakov – revolutionary, activist of VMRO
- Georgi Ikonomov (1822–1865/7) – key figure of the National Revival period of Bulgaria
- Georgi Kitov (1943–2008) - archeologist
- Georgi Nadzhakov (1896–1981) - Dean of Sofia University "St. Kl. Ohridski" (1945–1952), physicist, "the father of the Xerox copier", academic
- Ivan Bozhilov (1940–2016) – historian, professor
- Lyubomir Dyakovski (b. 1951) – opera singer, father of Ludmila Dyakovska (co-founder of "No Angels" pop-band from Germany)
- Nikola Drenski (1898–1944) – Bulgarian colonel
- Nikola Lazarov (1880–1900) – Bulgarian revolutionary, member of VMORO
- Patricki Sandev (1882 - 1959) born in Kazanlak and spent most of his life in Dupnitsa.
- Plamen Oresharski, former Prime Minister of Bulgaria, born in Dupnitsa.
- Tsvetan Sokolov – Bulgarian volleyball player
- Ventsislav Mutafchiyski (b. 1964) - military doctor and Head of the National Operational Headquarters for Fight with Coronavirus Pandemic in Bulgaria
- Voin Voinov (b. 1959) – director-choreographer, organizer of South-Western International Folklore Festival "Peace on the Balkans", Honorary Citizen of Dupnica
- Yane Sandanski, Bulgarian revolutionary and political activist (born in Vlahi, moved to Dupnica as a child)
