= Ventsislav Mutafchiyski =

Bulgarian military doctor (born 1964)

Major General Ventsislav Metodiev Mutafchiyski
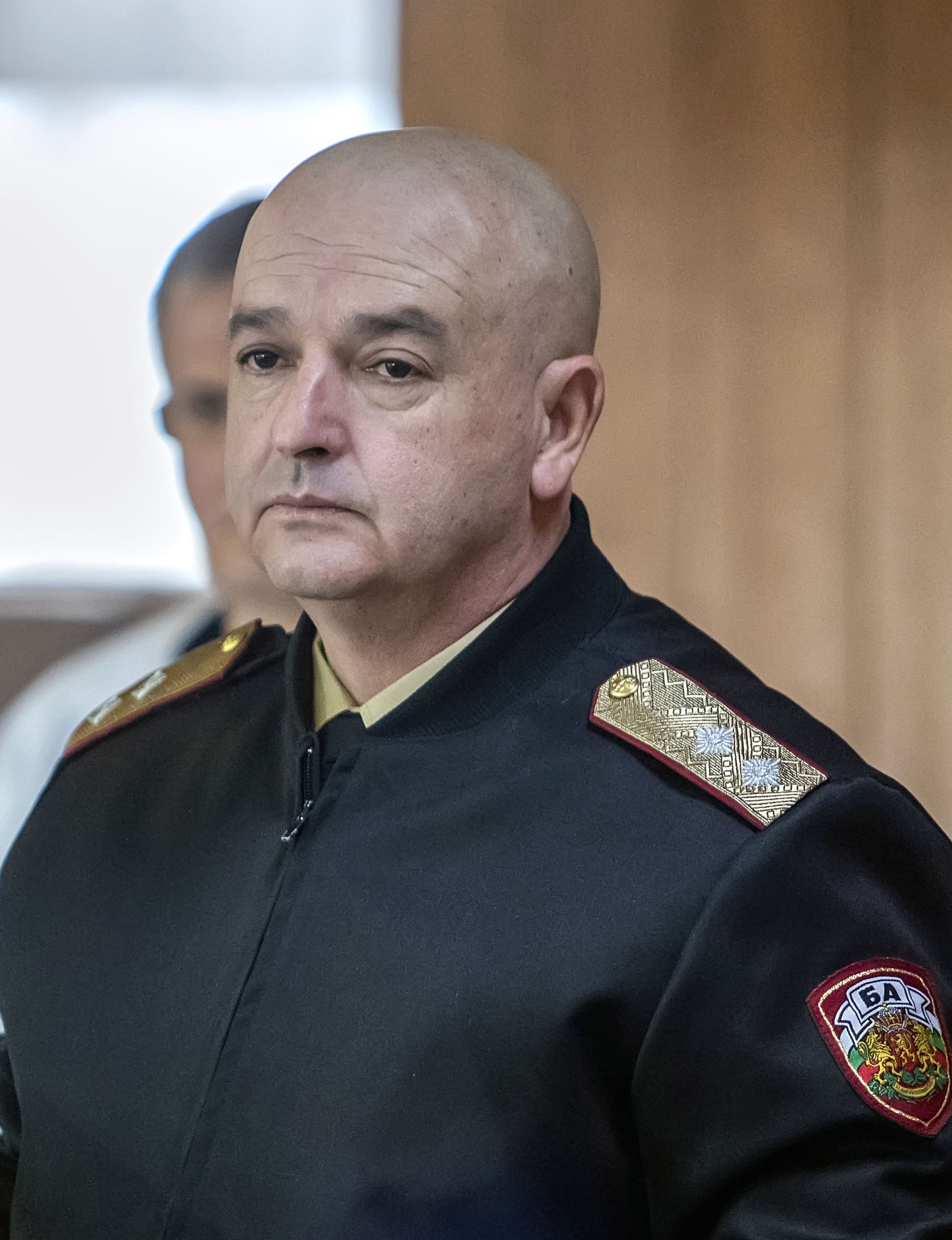
- Born: August 20, 1964 (age 62); Dupnitsa, Bulgaria
- Education: Medical University of Sofia (M.D.); Military Medical Academy (Bulgaria) (Ph.D.)
- Alma mater: Medical University of Sofia
- Spouse: Elena Mutafchiyska
- Children: Mark Mutafchiyski; Alexander Mutafchiyski
- Scientific career
- Fields: Medicine, general surgery, military surgery
- Workplaces: Military Medical Academy (Bulgaria)
- Thesis: Explosive trauma - a common characteristic, diagnostic and healing algorithm (2011)
- Doctoral advisor: Borimir Vasilev

Ventsislav Metodiev Mutafchiyski (Bulgarian: Венцислав Методиев Мутафчийски; born 20 August 1964) is a Bulgarian military doctor, professor and director at the Military Medical Academy (MMA), Major General from the Military Medical Service, and former Head of the National Operational Headquarters for Fight with Coronavirus Pandemic in Bulgaria.

== Biography ==
Ventsislav Mutafchiyski was born in Dupnitsa, Bulgaria and graduated as a medical doctor from the Medical University of Sofia in 1990. In 1989, he joined the Bulgarian army as a Lieutenant. From 1991 to 1993, he was the Head of Medical Service at the IV Kilometer Division. In 1996, he completed a specialization in general surgery. Between 1997 and 2002, he was an assistant professor at the Clinic for Vascular Surgery at MMA. From 2000 to 2003, he was a Senior Assistant Professor at the General Surgery Clinic at MMA. In 2005, he specialized in military surgery and became a doctoral student the same year. He graduated in 2011 and was promoted to associate professor in 2012. In 2014, he became the Head of the MMA Surgery Department. In the same year, he became the Deputy Head of the academy. Since 2015, he has been a professor of surgery.

In 2017, Mutafchiyski was appointed acting Head of the Military Medical Academy. On 7 February 2018, by decree of the President of the Republic of Bulgaria and with order by the Minister of Defense was appointed Chief of the MMA and Chief Doctor of the Armed Forces of the Republic of Bulgaria. On 6 May 2019, by decree of the President of Bulgaria, he was granted the highest rank of Major General.

== Family ==
Mutafchiyski is married. His wife Elena is a psychiatrist and they have twin sons Mark and Alexander (born 1994). Both sons graduated in the United Kingdom, Mark in Economics and Alexander in Law.

== Chairman of the National Crisis Management Staff ==
After the outbreak of the COVID-19 pandemic in the country, Mutafchiyski was appointed Chairman of the National Crisis Management Staff on 24 February 2020. The general started holding daily briefings where he read out statistical updates and took questions from reporters. He quickly became popular and was arguably the public figure most closely associated with the fight against the pandemic in the country.

Mutafchiyski has been consistently advocating the need for social distancing as the only proven measure that can slow the spread of the coronavirus and prevent a collapse of the healthcare system. As early as 13 March 2020, he stated "The key word for all measures is social distancing and self-isolation". On 10 April 2020, he was worried that "there were bunches of 7-8 people on the streets" and has linked this to a spike in infections the following week. Because the Bulgarian government did not officially shut down church services as done in neighboring Balkan countries, Mutafchiyski watched the Easter services only on TV, and was pleased that social distancing measures and the low attendance were sufficient to prevent the churches from becoming a source of contagion, despite reports that the number of people attending the Alexander Nevsky liturgy alone were in the hundreds. His expectations were for another spike in infections related to increased inter-city travel during the Easter holidays.

On 1 May 2020, the general was hailed as a hero by Le Temps for handling the pandemic in Bulgaria, despite critical attitudes on his decisions in Bulgarian media, and was highly praised for refusing to report discriminatory ethnic statistics against the Roma minority of Bulgarian citizens. Mutafchiyski was also commended in Bulgaria for his professionalism and attempts to refrain from politicizing the pandemic.

During the summer of 2020, Mutafchiyski formally remained chairman of the National Crisis Management Staff, but was de facto relegated to a more peripheral role, with new Health Minister Kostadin Angelov starting to lead the daily briefings and sessions on the COVID-19 situation in the country. The general's brash speaking style and clashes with journalists are believed to have contributed to eroding his public image among a number of Bulgarians. In a December 2021 interview, Mutafchiyski stated that Bulgaria had pursued a COVID-Zero rather than a "living with COVID" strategy until 13 May 2020.

The country was very strongly affected by a second wave in the autumn of 2020 and a third one in the spring of 2021. Mutafchiyski has been lauded for being one of the few public figures who remained consistent in demanding the adoption of an uncompromising approach to the virus, refusing to downplay the seriousness of the epidemiological situation in the country, though his position is believed to have ultimately become a minority view within the National Operational Headquarters, which was disbanded in mid April 2021, as well as among many politicians. He has, however, also been criticized himself for bowing down to political pressure and reneging on certain medical principles as well as for playing a part in the decision adopted by Bulgaria not to make full use of its initial EU vaccine quota.

== Military missions ==
- 2000 Radusha Refugee Camp, North Macedonia
- 2003 Medical evacuation of victims of the terrorist attack in Kerbala, Iraq
- 2004 (January) Medical evacuation of the victims of the terrorist act in Kerbala from Landstuhl Hospital, Germany to the Military Medical Academy, Sofia
- 2004 (May) Medical evacuation of servicemen from Landstuhl Hospital, Germany to Military Medical Academy, Sofia
- 2006–2007 Surgeon at the Spanish Military Field Hospital, Arena Base, Herat, Afghanistan

== See also ==
- Coronavirus disease 2019
- COVID-19 pandemic
