= COVID-19 vaccination in Colombia =

Plan to immunize against COVID-19

COVID-19 vaccination campaign in Colombia
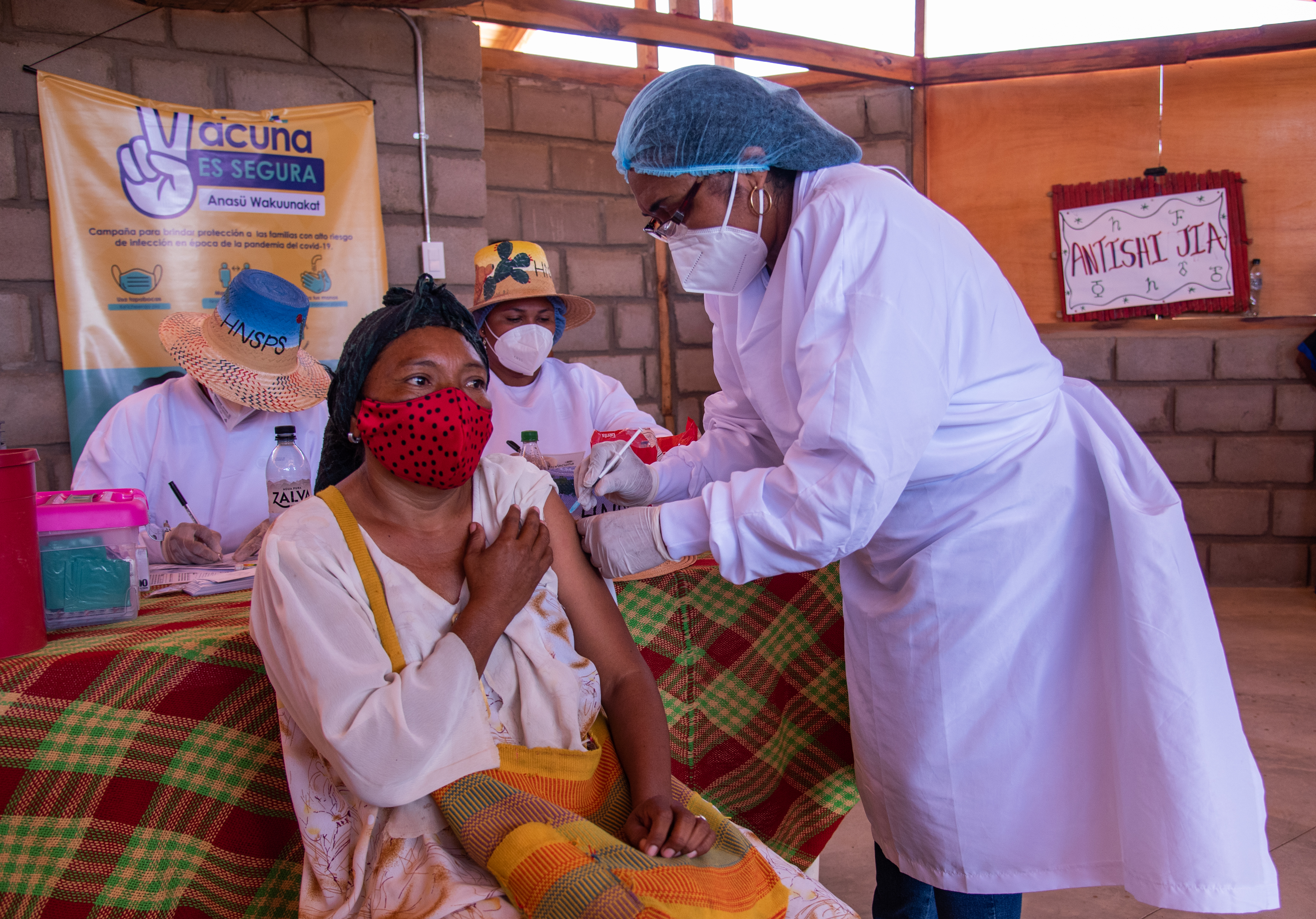
- Woman in Colombia receives a COVID-19 vaccine, July 2021
- Native name: Plan Nacional de Vacunación contra la Covid-19
- Date: 17 February 2021 – present
- Location: Colombia
- Cause: COVID-19 pandemic in Colombia
- Target: Immunisation of Colombians and legal foreign residents in Colombia against COVID-19
- Organised by: Ministry of Health of Colombia
- Participants: 42,652,366 people have received at least one vaccine dose 36,507,746 total fully vaccinated people (as of 16 August 2022, 23:59 UTC–5)
- Outcome: 83.6% of the Colombian population has received at least one dose of a vaccine 71.5% of the Colombian population is fully vaccinated
- Website: Ministerio de Salud y Protección Social

The COVID-19 vaccination program in Colombia is an ongoing effort of mass immunization put in place by the Colombian government in order to respond to the ongoing COVID-19 pandemic. The virus causing COVID-19 was confirmed to have reached Colombia on 6 March 2020. Colombia's preparation and readiness for a vaccine program allowed it to join the first group of countries who received vaccines through COVAX. The first vaccine in Colombia was given to a nurse on 17 February 2021.

Over 70 percent of the population is fully vaccinated. As of 16 August 2022, 36,027,994 people have received their first dose of a two-dose vaccine and 29,883,374 of them also received the second dose, while 6,624,372 people have been vaccinated with single-dose vaccines, for a total of 36,507,746 fully vaccinated people. In addition to this, 13,731,703 people have received first booster doses and 1,470,593 people received a second booster dose for a total of 87,738,036 vaccine doses administered across the country.

== Background ==
=== Purchase agreements ===
On 28 July 2020, Health Minister Fernando Ruiz stated in an interview with W Radio that Colombia had signed confidentiality agreements with two pharmaceutical companies, Pfizer and AstraZeneca, for the acquisition of a vaccine for COVID-19, and that the country would seek agreements with at least three other companies.

=== Clinical trials ===
On 24 August, Minister Ruiz confirmed the participation of Colombian volunteers in the Phase III trials of the Ad26.COV2.S vaccine, developed by Janssen Pharmaceuticals. The clinical trials were scheduled to take place within weeks, once the report on the previous stages of the vaccine was available. Ruiz added that a confidentiality agreement had already been signed. On 7 October, the Phase III clinical trials of the vaccine developed by Janssen Pharmaceutica began, with the application of the first dose to a volunteer in Floridablanca. The trials of this vaccine were being carried out in 10 medical centers throughout the country. On 12 October, Johnson & Johnson announced it would briefly pause the trials after one volunteer became ill with "an unexplained disease".

== Vaccination schedule ==
After the Colombian government was promised 40 million doses from Pfizer and AstraZeneca, on 18 December 2020 the government announced a schedule for the vaccination program. Mass vaccination began in February 2021 and was divided into five stages with the goal of achieving herd immunity. In the first phase, the objective was reducing mortality and severe case incidence rates from COVID-19, as well as protecting health workers. The second phase was aimed at reducing infection rates. When the vaccination plan was announced, the government expected to vaccinate roughly 70% of the Colombian population, or 35.7 million people. Initially, people who had already had the disease were not to be vaccinated, nor would children under 16 as vaccines had not been tested on that age group.

Phases and stages of Colombian vaccination plan
| Phase | Stage | Began | Eligibility | Population covered |
| 1 | 1 | 17 February 2021 | All front-line health and support workers, and people aged over 80. | 1,453,432 |
| 1 | 2 | 15 March 2021 | All remaining health and support workers, people aged 60–79, and control body officers. | 6,620,274 |
| 1 | 3 | 21 May 2021 | People aged 50–59, people aged 16–49 with comorbidities, and all elementary and high school teachers. | 9,325,861 |
| 2 | 4 | 15 June 2021 | Institutional caregivers and population involved in risky occupations and situations, people aged 40–49 without comorbidities. | 8,436,318 |
| 2 | 5 | 14 July 2021 | People aged 16–39 without comorbidities. | 15,750,703 |

On 29 January 2021, President Iván Duque signed the decree for the National Plan of Vaccination which had been announced in December as the country's guideline for mass vaccination, and he announced that vaccinations in Colombia would begin on 20 February 2021.

In an interview published 11 April 2021, Minister Ruiz said that progress was being made with the vaccination of people in their 70s. At that time, the goal was to vaccinate adults with comorbidities by mid-year and begin Phase 2 in the second half of 2021. Vaccination of people over 65 began on 13 April, and the minimum age was lowered to 60 on 30 April.

Originally, Stage 3 was to include people aged 16–59 with comorbidities, while those in that age group who did not have comorbidities were to wait until Stage 5. On 3 May 2021, it was announced that everyone in their 50s, with or without comorbidities, would become eligible in Stage 3. On 8 May 2021, the Colombian government issued the Decree 466 with the new adjustments to the country's vaccination plan. Workers of health care companies (EPS) and those who work in control bodies and different organizations that assist, accompany and validate the process of management of the pandemic were prioritized in Stage 2, while people with additional comorbidities such as AIDS, cancer, tuberculosis, obesity and others were included in Stage 3 along with the population aged 50–59. Furthermore, Stage 4 was updated to include people aged 40–49, members of relief corps, inmates and those in permanent contact with them, as well as street dwellers, while Stage 5 will now only include the population aged 16–39 without comorbidities.

=== Foreign residents ===
In December 2020, President Duque said that undocumented Venezuelan immigrants would not be eligible for a vaccine in Colombia since he expected that Venezuelans would "stampede the border" if that opportunity was presented to them. The January 2021 decree specified that foreigners accredited on diplomatic or consular missions within Colombia would be eligible for a vaccine. It was expected that other foreigners would also eventually be eligible. In mid-April 2021, the U.S. Embassy website was updated to reflect that U.S. citizens had become eligible to receive the vaccine in Colombia.

=== Beginning of vaccinations ===
On 15 February 2021, Minister Ruiz confirmed that an intensive care nurse from Sincelejo's University Hospital and another nurse from the National Cancerology Institute in Bogotá would be the first two people to be vaccinated in the country, on 17 February. As planned, intensive care nurse Verónica Machado was the first to be vaccinated on the morning of 17 February, under widespread media coverage.

== Vaccines on order ==
As of 20 March 2021, Colombia had received 2,472,964 Sinovac doses, 400,242 Pfizer-BioNTech doses from bilateral agreements, and 117,000 additional Pfizer doses and 244,800 AstraZeneca doses through the COVAX strategy.

=== Bilateral deals ===
| Vaccine | Progress | Doses ordered | Emergency Use Authorization | Deployment |
|---|---|---|---|---|
| Pfizer–BioNTech | Phase III clinical trials | 15 million | 5 January 2021 | 15 February 2021 |
| Sinovac | Phase III clinical trials | 11.5 million | 3 February 2021 | 20 February 2021 |
| Oxford–AstraZeneca | Phase III clinical trials | 10 million | 23 February 2021 | 20 March 2021 |
| Janssen | Phase III clinical trials | 11.5 million | 25 March 2021 | 24 June 2021 |
| Moderna | Phase III clinical trials | 10 million | 25 June 2021 | 25 July 2021 |

=== Multilateral mechanisms ===
| Mechanism | Doses ordered | Joined | Deployment |
|---|---|---|---|
| COVAX | 20 million | 22 September 2020 | 1 March 2021 |

== Vaccines in trial stage ==
| Vaccine | Type (technology) | Phase I | Phase II | Phase III |
|---|---|---|---|---|
| Clover | Subunit | Completed | Completed | Completed |
| CureVac | RNA | Completed | Completed | In progress |

== Deployment ==
On 29 January, President Iván Duque confirmed the purchase of 10 million doses from Moderna and 2.5 million doses from Sinovac. Along with 10 million doses from Pfizer–BioNTech, 10 million doses from Oxford–AstraZeneca, 9 million doses from Janssen, and 20 million doses through COVAX, the government expected to be able to cover the 34 million Colombians eligible for vaccination.

On 15 February, the first batch of COVID-19 vaccines manufactured by Pfizer and BioNTech, containing 50,000 doses, arrived at El Dorado International Airport in Bogotá where it was received by President Iván Duque, Vice President Marta Lucía Ramírez, and Minister of Health Fernando Ruiz. Duque said that this first batch of vaccines would be destined for front-line health and support personnel, while also confirming that the Colombian government expected the arrival of 1,600,000 additional doses within the following 30 days.

On 19 February, the Ministry of Health confirmed that at least 45,000 doses out of the first shipment of 192,000 doses of the vaccine by Sinovac, which were expected to arrive in the country the following day, would be sent to the municipalities of Leticia, Puerto Nariño, Mitú, and Inírida in the departments of Amazonas, Vaupés, and Guainía to immunize the entirety of the population aged over 18. Those three departments border Brazil, and the Colombian government's intent was to epidemiologically "blockade" the Brazilian variant and prevent its arrival in other areas of the country. This exceptional measure did not cover pregnant women nor people with a COVID-19 positive test result earlier than 90 days. (The Pfizer vaccine was also effective against the Gamma variant, according to a study published 8 March in the New England Journal of Medicine.)

During the first two weeks of the vaccination program, 191,480 first doses were administered. Public health expert Luis Jorge Hernández said the distribution was operating under a scarcity mentality given that only 509,724 doses had arrived in Colombia (including the ones already administered), whereas the Health Ministry had expected to have 850,000 by that point. Over the next month, an additional 3 million doses arrived. The former health minister Gabriel Riveros acknowledged that the vaccination program remained limited by this relatively low number.

In the first days of April 2021, it was revealed that thousands of people over 70 in several regions and cities in the country, such as Cartagena, Barrancabermeja, and Cali had refused to be vaccinated upon finding out that the vaccine assigned to them was the one by Oxford–AstraZeneca as their relatives, caretakers or even themselves expressed concerns on the safety of the vaccine after events of blood clots after vaccination as well as the suspension of its rollout in some European countries became known. In Cartagena, it was reported that less than 1,000 doses out of a first shipment of 7,100 had been administered, while in Barrancabemeja only 400 out of 920 doses had been administered, and in Cali the rates of refusal of that specific vaccine were also higher than those of the other two manufacturers in distribution in the country (Pfizer–BioNTech and Sinovac). Despite this, Minister of Health Fernando Ruiz has encouraged the administration of the Oxford–AstraZeneca vaccine, stating that thromboembolic events were found to happen in only one per million vaccinated people, a higher rate than in people consuming contraceptives at one per 10,000 people, as well as citing the recommendations issued by the World Health Organization (WHO) and the European Medicines Agency (EMA) to continue administering the vaccine, confirming that the vaccine's benefits still outweighed its potential risks.

On 15 June 2021, the Ministry of Health announced an extension of the interval between doses of the Pfizer–BioNTech vaccine from 21 to 84 days (12 weeks) starting from Stage 4, backing its decision on scientific evidence showing a greater effectiveness of the vaccine when the interval between doses was extended, as well as citing the examples of the vaccination programs in the United Kingdom, Canada, Denmark, Norway and France, where the same decision had been adopted. In response to this decision, Pfizer issued a release stating that the safety and efficiency of the vaccine were tested with a 21-day interval, and that no other periods of time between doses had been tested since the volunteers taking part in their tests did not receive their second dose above said interval, which prompted backlash from users and academic organizations who were concerned about possible effects on the effectiveness of the vaccine. However, the manufacturer also stated that recommendations on intervals between doses depended on the health authorities of each country and may be based on public health principles.

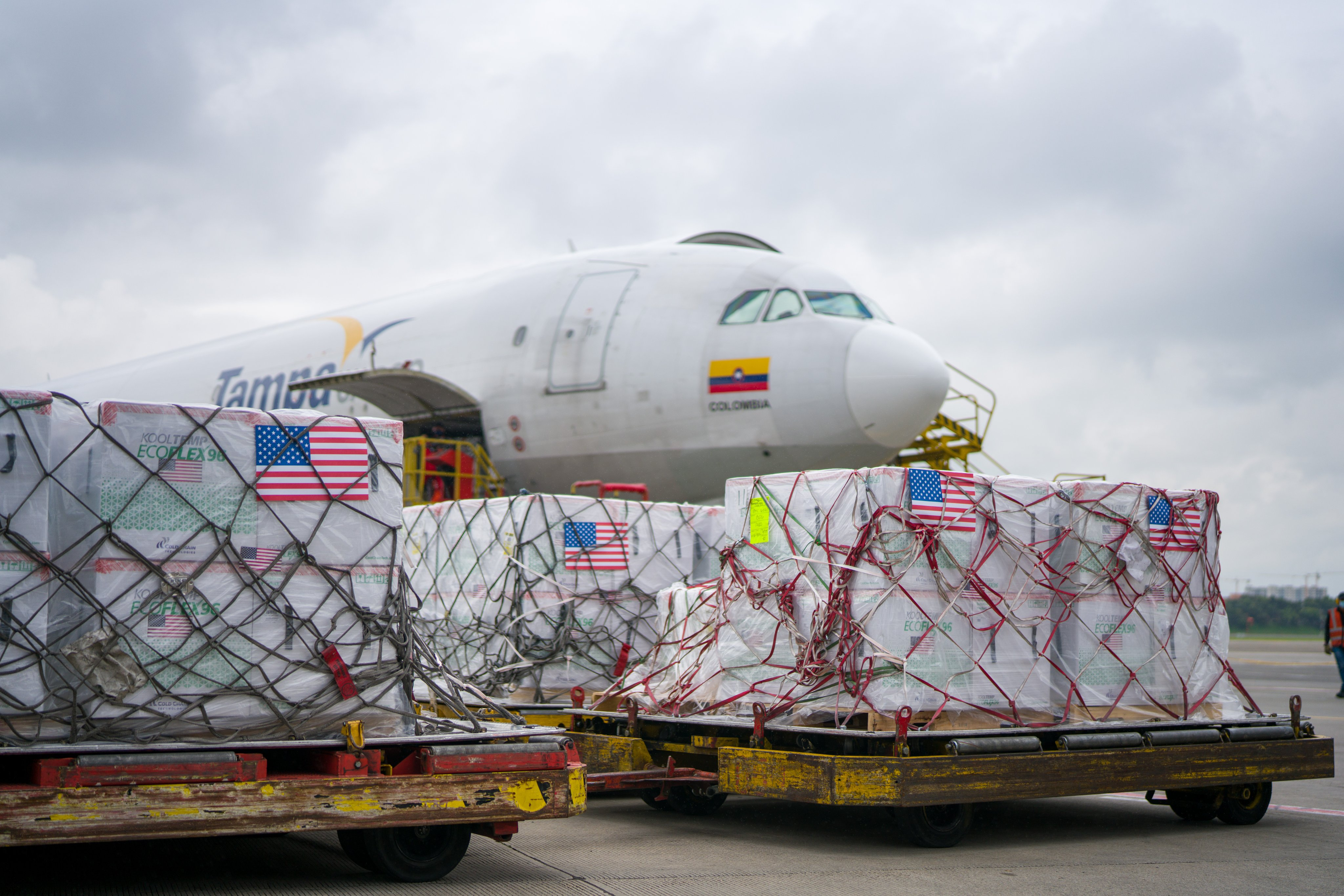
The US delivered Moderna COVID-19 vaccines to Colombia as part of the COVAX program in 2021.

On 24 August 2021, the National Institute of Food and Drug Surveillance (Invima) advised the Colombian government not to extend the interval of the Pfizer vaccine to 84 days, arguing the lack of enough scientific evidence supporting such an extension and recommended to continue following the 21-day interval suggested by the manufacturer. However, Invima also stated that the government was not prevented to extend the interval of vaccines if there was enough scientific research backing such a measure and if further development of the pandemic and the vaccination campaign warranted it. At the same time, the Ministry of Health also requested to extend the interval of the Moderna vaccine (made under the same technology as the Pfizer one) to 84 days. On 3 September 2021, the interval of the Moderna vaccine for people without comorbidities aged below 50 was also extended to 84 days, citing the scientific evidence available, the experiences of other countries with this vaccine as well as Colombia's own experience with vaccines from other manufacturers.

On 16 September 2021, the Ministry of Health issued new guidelines for vaccine rollout, aiming to achieve the goal of 35 million people immunized by 31 December 2021:

- Population aged over 18 will be administered any of the Oxford–AstraZeneca, Sinovac or Janssen vaccines.
- Population aged 12–17 will be vaccinated with Pfizer, and due to the limited availability of that vaccine, the Moderna one could also be used for this age group pending approval by Invima.
- Highly dispersed populations, especially those based in remote areas of the Vichada, Chocó, and La Guajira departments, will be covered with the Janssen single-dose vaccine.
- The recommendation to administer the second dose of the Pfizer, Moderna, and AstraZeneca vaccines after 84 days was kept in place, except for those people who might need to receive their second dose at a shorter interval for traveling or study reasons, in which case they might get their second dose at any moment between the 24th and the 84th day after their first dose.

=== Booster doses ===
On 16 September 2021, accompanying updates to the national vaccination plan, the Ministry of Health approved booster doses for people aged over 70. The first booster doses were administered on 1 October. On 19 November 2021, the minimum age was lowered to 50. On 21 December 2021, the minimum age was lowered to 18.

Initially, boosters were available by appointment only and could be scheduled through healthcare providers (EPS). When the minimum age was lowered to 18, boosters were administered even without EPS and without appointment.

The rollout began with people over 70 because this age group has lower immune capacity and higher mortality rates, and for them a third dose can be especially protective. The Ministry advised that individuals receive a booster dose from the same manufacturer as their previous doses, or an mRNA vaccine such as the Pfizer or Moderna ones, and that it be administered at least six months after their second dose.

On 6 May 2022, the government authorized a fourth dose for everyone over 50.

=== Support ===
Uber announced that, beginning 12 April 2021, it would offer up to 25,000 free rides, valued at a maximum of COP 10,000 per ride, if they were taken to or from a vaccination center. Each person could request up to two rides through the app.

== Opinion polling ==
Before vaccinations began, a poll conducted from 9 November to 10 December 2020 by the National Administrative Department of Statistics (Dane) found that only half of Colombians wanted to be vaccinated against coronavirus. In Quibdó, 72 percent said they wanted the vaccine, but in Cali, only 43 percent wanted it. Among those who said they did not want the vaccine, most said they feared side effects.

In Bogotá, a poll conducted 9–25 February 2021 found that 58% wanted to be vaccinated, 19% did not, and 23% were still unsure.

Polls conducted between January and March 2021 in 23 cities, as analyzed by the Dane found that 76% of men and 70% of women wanted to be vaccinated.

== Progress ==
On 6 May 2022, President Duque celebrated having achieved the original goal of vaccinating 70% of the Colombian population, or 35.7 million people.

The information below is sourced from the official daily statistics published by the Ministry of Health of Colombia.

=== Doses by department ===
As of 16 August 2022

| Department | Population (est. 2021) | Assigned doses | Administered doses |
|---|---|---|---|
| Amazonas | 80,464 | 145,842 | 143,782 |
| Antioquia | 6,782,584 | 11,746,999 | 12,650,795 |
| Arauca | 301,270 | 405,457 | 418,967 |
| Atlántico (Note: Including Barranquilla.) | 2,771,139 | 4,971,426 | 5,124,420 |
| Bogotá, D.C. | 7,834,167 | 14,817,222 | 16,259,697 |
| Bolívar (Note: Including Cartagena.) | 2,213,061 | 3,494,209 | 3,805,572 |
| Boyacá | 1,251,675 | 2,230,333 | 2,442,297 |
| Caldas | 1,027,314 | 1,906,509 | 1,888,850 |
| Caquetá | 414,841 | 505,526 | 507,863 |
| Casanare | 439,238 | 684,606 | 737,118 |
| Cauca | 1,504,044 | 1,633,193 | 1,550,774 |
| Cesar | 1,322,466 | 1,893,903 | 1,925,128 |
| Chocó | 549,225 | 510,852 | 462,409 |
| Córdoba | 1,844,076 | 2,679,284 | 2,713,976 |
| Cundinamarca | 3,372,221 | 4,888,257 | 5,388,340 |
| Guainía | 51,450 | 60,040 | 55,103 |
| Guaviare | 88,490 | 109,840 | 120,047 |
| Huila | 1,131,934 | 1,717,370 | 1,819,813 |
| La Guajira | 987,781 | 1,209,920 | 1,349,680 |
| Magdalena (Note: Including Santa Marta.) | 1,449,087 | 2,188,577 | 2,261,952 |
| Meta | 1,072,412 | 1,562,968 | 1,625,608 |
| Nariño | 1,627,386 | 2,274,383 | 2,463,565 |
| Norte de Santander | 1,642,746 | 2,531,301 | 2,648,060 |
| Putumayo | 364,085 | 366,055 | 357,134 |
| Quindío | 562,177 | 1,157,949 | 1,113,309 |
| Risaralda | 968,626 | 1,752,333 | 1,830,701 |
| San Andrés | 64,672 | 137,703 | 132,732 |
| Santander | 2,306,455 | 3,836,943 | 3,956,857 |
| Sucre | 962,457 | 1,444,326 | 1,552,247 |
| Tolima | 1,343,898 | 2,447,524 | 2,528,355 |
| Valle del Cauca (Note: Including Buenaventura.) | 4,556,752 | 7,329,521 | 7,757,296 |
| Vaupés | 46,808 | 46,439 | 43,152 |
| Vichada | 114,557 | 105,064 | 87,187 |
| Colombia | 51,049,498 | 82,791,874 | 87,738,036 |
