= Las Mirañas =

- Location in Amazonas and Colombia Las Mirañas (Colombia)
- Coordinates: 1°19′25.6224″S 70°48′49.3524″W
- Country: Colombia
- Department: Amazonas Department
- Municipality: Mirití-Paraná
- Elevation: 381 ft (116 m)
- Time zone: UTC-5 (Colombia Standard Time)

Las Mirañas is a vereda in Mirití-Paraná Municipality, Amazonas Department Department in Colombia.

== Climate ==
Las Mirañas has a tropical rainforest climate (Af) with heavy to very heavy rainfall year-round.

Climate data for Las Mirañas
Month	Jan	Feb	Mar	Apr	May	Jun	Jul	Aug	Sep	Oct	Nov	Dec	Year
Mean daily maximum °C (°F)	30.8 (87.4)	31.2 (88.2)	30.9 (87.6)	31.2 (88.2)	30.1 (86.2)	29.2 (84.6)	29.5 (85.1)	30.2 (86.4)	30.5 (86.9)	30.3 (86.5)	30.8 (87.4)	31.2 (88.2)	30.5 (86.9)
Daily mean °C (°F)	26.2 (79.2)	26.3 (79.3)	26.3 (79.3)	26.4 (79.5)	26.1 (79.0)	25.2 (77.4)	25.2 (77.4)	25.5 (77.9)	25.9 (78.6)	26.1 (79.0)	26.8 (80.2)	26.5 (79.7)	26.0 (78.9)
Mean daily minimum °C (°F)	21.7 (71.1)	21.5 (70.7)	21.8 (71.2)	21.6 (70.9)	22.1 (71.8)	21.3 (70.3)	21.0 (69.8)	20.9 (69.6)	21.4 (70.5)	22.0 (71.6)	22.9 (73.2)	21.8 (71.2)	21.7 (71.0)
Average rainfall mm (inches)	249.8 (9.83)	318.7 (12.55)	341.4 (13.44)	411.5 (16.20)	389.8 (15.35)	328.2 (12.92)	284.6 (11.20)	225.0 (8.86)	266.0 (10.47)	291.4 (11.47)	288.8 (11.37)	305.9 (12.04)	3,701.1 (145.7)
Average rainy days	13	14	16	17	18	18	17	14	13	14	14	15	183
Source 1: IDEAM
Source 2: Climate-Data.org
