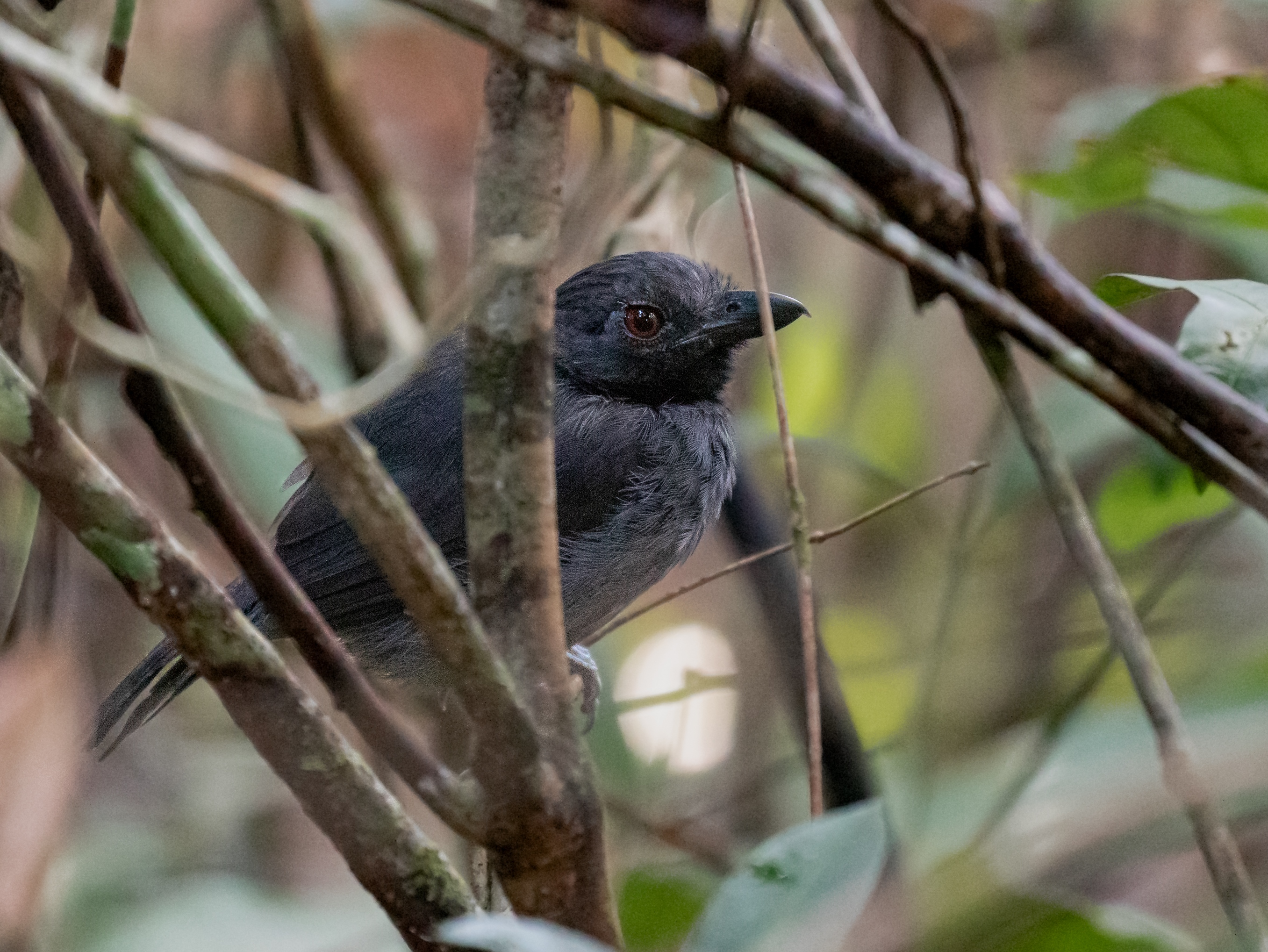
- Male black-throated antshrike

Conservation status
- Least Concern (IUCN 3.1)

Scientific classification
- Kingdom: Animalia
- Phylum: Chordata
- Class: Aves
- Order: Passeriformes
- Family: Thamnophilidae
- Genus: Frederickena
- Species: F. viridis

Binomial name
- Frederickena viridis (Vieillot, 1816)

= Black-throated antshrike =

Species of bird

The black-throated antshrike (Frederickena viridis) is a species of bird in subfamily Thamnophilinae of family Thamnophilidae, the "typical antbirds". It is native to the Guiana Shield.

== Taxonomy and systematics ==
The black-throated antshrike shares genus Frederickena with the undulated antshrike (F. unduliger) and fulvous antshrike (F. fulva). It is monotypic.

== Description ==
The black-throated antshrike is a large dark antbird, 19 to 22 cm (7.5 to 8.7 in) long and weighing 65 to 75 g (2.3 to 2.6 oz). The species exhibits significant sexual dimorphism, though both sexes have a crest (that usually is flattened), red irises, and a heavy black bill with a hook at the end like true shrikes. Adult males are mostly slate gray with a black head, throat, and breast, a usually hidden small white patch between their scapulars, and faint white bars on their tail. Adult females have a rufous crest, nape, upperparts, and wings. Their forehead, sides of their head, underparts, and tail are barred with pale buff to white and blackish brown; their flanks have a rufous tinge. Subadult males have mixed gray and brown upperparts and underparts like adult females'.

== Distribution and habitat ==
The black-throated antshrike is found from eastern Bolívar state in Venezuela east through the Guianas and through northeastern Amazonian Brazil north of the Amazon from the lower Rio Negro east to the Atlantic in Amapá. It inhabits lowland evergreen forest, typically those on sandy soils and in terra firme. It favors dense vegetation in the understorey, especially at openings such as those formed by fallen trees. In elevation it ranges from sea level to 700 m (2,300 ft) in most of its range but only to 500 m (1,600 ft) in Venezuela.

== Behavior ==
=== Movement ===
The black-throated antshrike is presumed to be a year-round resident throughout its range.

=== Feeding ===
The black-throated antshrike's diet has not been detailed but is known to include large insects and other arthropods. It forages singly or in pairs, mostly low to the ground or on it in dense foliage and vine tangles. It hops deliberately from branch to branch and along the ground, reaching or jumping from a perch to glean prey from leaves, stems, branches, leaf litter, and rotten logs. It occasionally follows army ant swarms to catch prey disturbed by the ants.

=== Breeding ===
The black-throated antshrike breeds between October and March in Suriname but its season is not known elsewhere. The one known nest was a basket suspended in a branch fork in a low shrub. It contained two eggs that were creamy white with purplish markings. The incubation period, time to fledging, and details of parental care are not known.

=== Vocalization ===
The black-throated antshrike's song is a "slow series of 10-15 first rising, then leveling out, fluted 'tuh' notes" that span six to seven seconds. It has also been described as "a slow, almost hypnotic [series] of clear, insistent whistles, peeeur, peeeur, peeur... at a steady pace". Its call is "a long (e.g. 1 second), nasal, downward-inflected churr".

== Status ==
The IUCN has assessed the black-throated antshrike as being of Least Concern. It has a large range; its population size is not known and is believed to be decreasing. No immediate threats have been identified. It is considered uncommon to rare in most of its range. It occurs in at least two protected areas in Venezuela, and its range "includes large areas of intact suitable habitat".
