= Puerto María Manteca =

- Location in Amazonas and Colombia Puerto María Manteca (Colombia)
- Coordinates: 1°24′15.1704″S 70°36′26.2512″W
- Country: Colombia
- Department: Amazonas Department
- Municipality: Mirití-Paraná
- Elevation: 358 ft (109 m)
- Time zone: UTC-5 (Colombia Standard Time)

Puerto María Manteca is a vereda in Mirití-Paraná Municipality, Amazonas Department Department in Colombia.

== Climate ==
Puerto María Manteca has a tropical rainforest climate (Af) with heavy to very heavy rainfall year-round.

Climate data for Puerto María Manteca
Month	Jan	Feb	Mar	Apr	May	Jun	Jul	Aug	Sep	Oct	Nov	Dec	Year
Mean daily maximum °C (°F)	30.7 (87.3)	31.1 (88.0)	30.8 (87.4)	31.0 (87.8)	30.0 (86.0)	29.1 (84.4)	29.5 (85.1)	30.2 (86.4)	30.6 (87.1)	30.4 (86.7)	30.8 (87.4)	31.0 (87.8)	30.4 (86.8)
Daily mean °C (°F)	26.2 (79.2)	26.3 (79.3)	26.2 (79.2)	26.2 (79.2)	26.0 (78.8)	25.1 (77.2)	25.2 (77.4)	25.5 (77.9)	25.9 (78.6)	26.1 (79.0)	26.7 (80.1)	26.3 (79.3)	26.0 (78.8)
Mean daily minimum °C (°F)	21.7 (71.1)	21.5 (70.7)	21.7 (71.1)	21.5 (70.7)	22.0 (71.6)	21.2 (70.2)	20.9 (69.6)	20.9 (69.6)	21.3 (70.3)	21.9 (71.4)	22.7 (72.9)	21.7 (71.1)	21.6 (70.9)
Average rainfall mm (inches)	324.1 (12.76)	343.2 (13.51)	362.9 (14.29)	488.1 (19.22)	437.1 (17.21)	413.5 (16.28)	295.4 (11.63)	227.9 (8.97)	257.0 (10.12)	278.5 (10.96)	302.5 (11.91)	358.4 (14.11)	4,088.6 (160.97)
Average rainy days	18	17	19	20	20	21	19	15	15	14	16	18	212
Source 1: IDEAM
Source 2: Climate-Data.org
