= Coat of arms of Amazonas Department =

Coat of arms of Amazonas
- Armiger: The Department of Amazonas.
- Adopted: March 2, 1995
- Shield: Roundel vert, a river winding palewise, azure.
- Supporters: Feather headdress affronté, orange and Or.
- Use: Gubernatorial Flag, official paperwork.

The coat of arms of the Amazonas was officially adopted by means of the Departmental Assembly Ordinance 020 of March 2, 1995. The coat of arms of Amazonas is also featured as a charge in the centre of the upper band of the Flag of Amazonas.

== Design and meaning ==
The coat of arms of the Department of Amazonas is almost round shield surrounded by an exterior crown of feathers.

The principal element is the roundel escutcheon which is shaped to resemble the Victoria amazonica’s big circular leaf which has two indented openings on the top and bottom. It is blazoned vert proper, also a reference to the Amazon Forest. It is charged by a flowing winding river which represents the Amazon River, which is a source of life and of great cultural, religious and political significance to the region.

The shield is supported by a feather headdress facing the viewer in warm colours. A feather headdress is of great significance for many Amazonian tribes and symbolize knowledge and hierarchy. In its affronté attitude it also has a triple meaning, representing both the sun and the flora of the Amazon as well.

The Amazonas coat of arms was designed by Colombian designer Rodrigo Gómez Claros.

Elements of the coat of arms of Amazonas
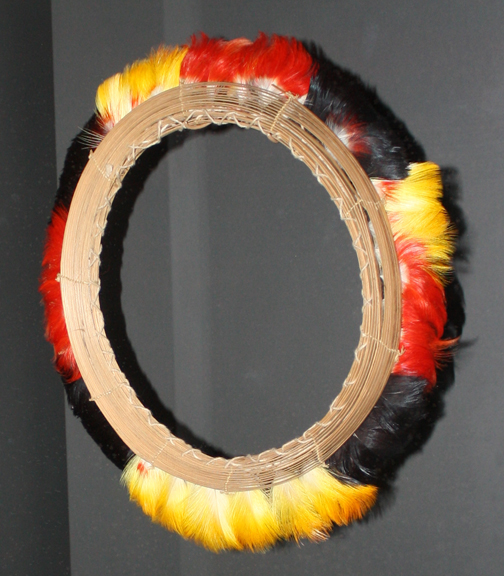
An Amazonic feather headdress.

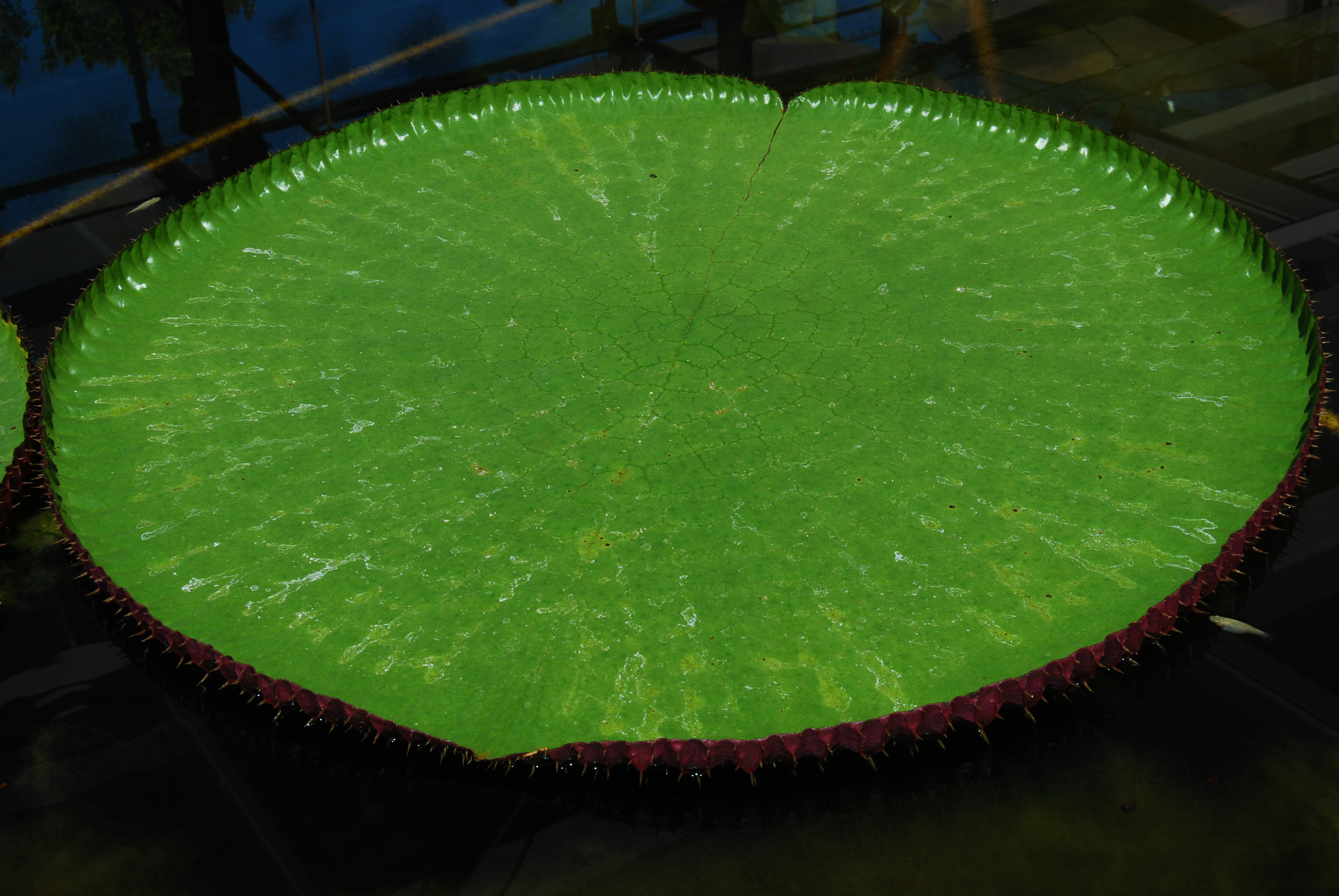
The leaf of the Victoria amazonica.

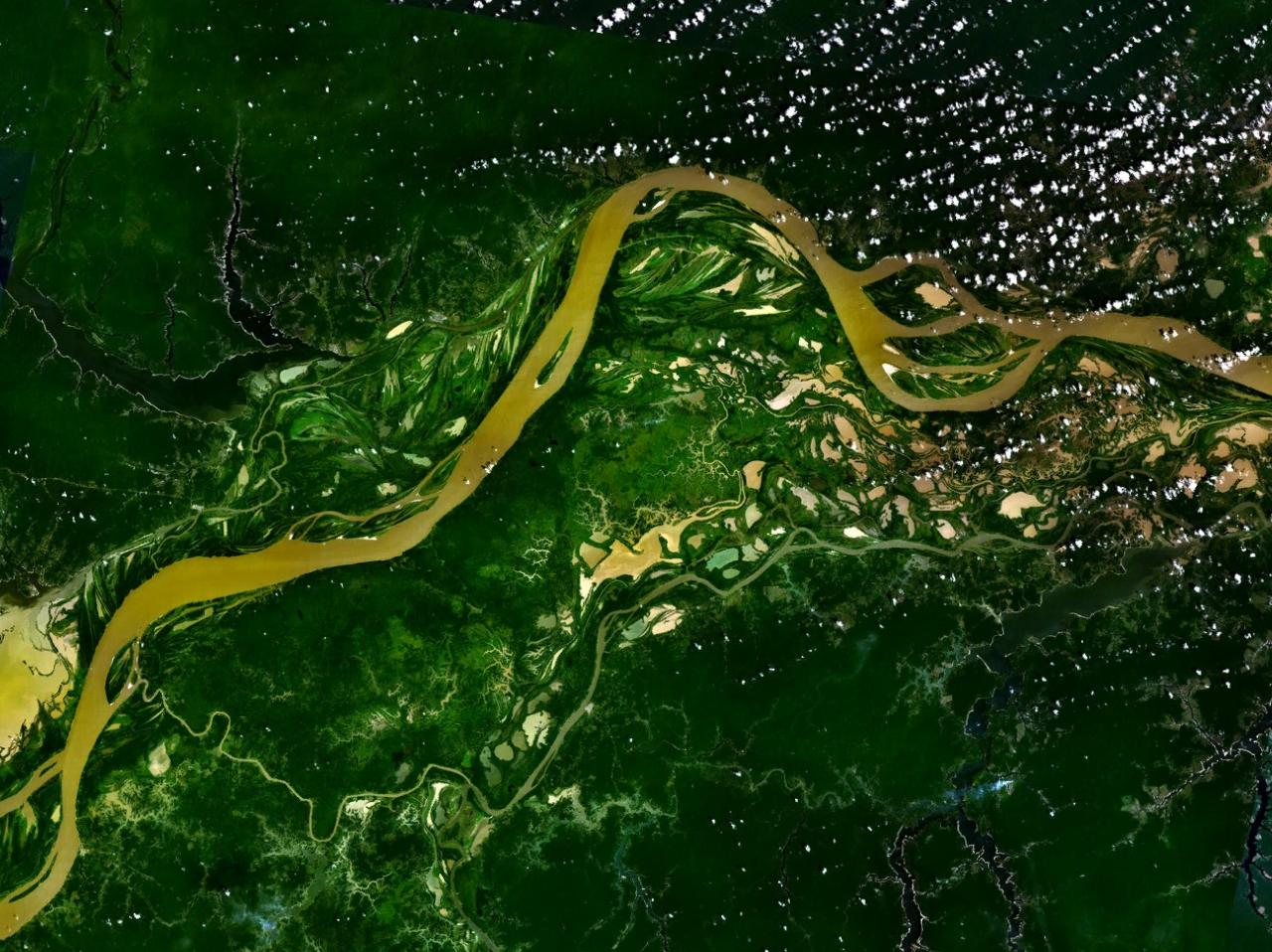
The winding Amazon River.

== See also ==
- Flag of the Department of Amazonas
