= RELIS =

Norwegian public medical information service

The RELIS logo

Regional Medicines Information Centres (RELIS) (Norwegian: Regionale legemiddelinformasjonssentre) is a publicly funded information service about medical drugs for health professionals in Norway. RELIS was established to aid rational and proper medicines use through producer-independent drug information to health professionals. RELIS started its service at two centres in 1995, and has since 2001 been established at university hospitals in all four health regions of Norway. All the centres are tied to the clinical pharmacology departments at the university hospitals. RELIS has a question-answer service which aids health professionals in matters of medical drugs, often specific to an individual patient. The target group and users of the service is primarily medical doctors, but also pharmacists, dentists, nurses and midwives use the service.

RELIS is also responsible for an information service aided at pregnant and breastfeeding women called Trygg Mammamedisin ('Safe Mommy Medicine'). This service is accessible through its own website, and also by phone. It is open to the public and is confidential and free of charge.

Another important role for RELIS is pharmacovigilance. RELIS receives adverse side effect alerts submitted by health professionals, and RELIS then judges the course and causalities of each case, and sends a written reply to the person who submitted the message. The adverse side effect reports are then registered in a national adverse side effect database, in close cooperation with the Norwegian Medicines Agency. RELIS is financed by the Ministry of Health and Care Services.
