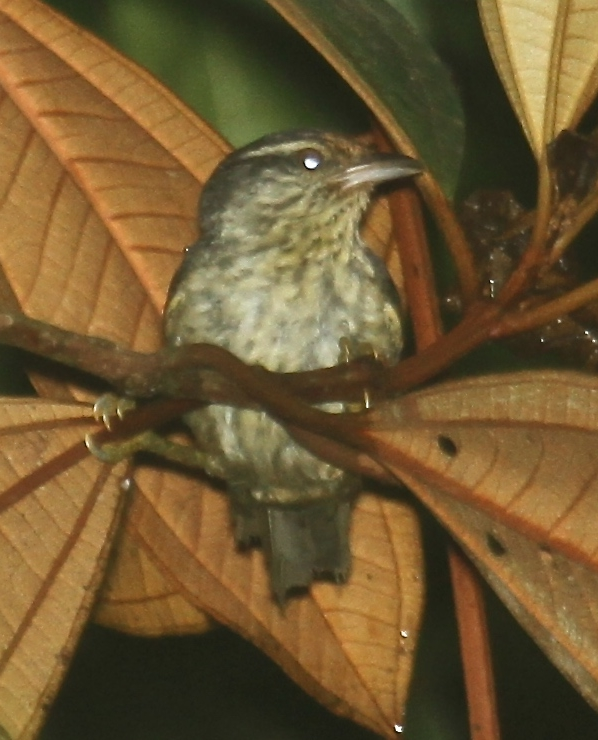

Conservation status
- Near Threatened (IUCN 3.1)

Scientific classification
- Kingdom: Animalia
- Phylum: Chordata
- Class: Aves
- Order: Passeriformes
- Family: Furnariidae
- Genus: Xenerpestes
- Species: X. singularis

Binomial name
- Xenerpestes singularis (Taczanowski & Berlepsch, 1885)

= Equatorial greytail =

Species of bird

The equatorial greytail (Xenerpestes singularis) is a Near Threatened species of bird in the Furnariinae subfamily of the ovenbird family Furnariidae. It is found in Ecuador and Peru.

== Taxonomy and systematics ==
The equatorial greytail is monotypic. It shares genus Xenerpestes with the double-banded greytail (X. minlosi) and together they are sister species to the orange-fronted plushcrown (Metopothrix aurantiaca).

== Description ==
The equatorial greytail is about 11.5 cm (4.5 in) long and weighs about 12 g (0.42 oz). It is a tiny furnariid that resembles a warbler. The sexes have the same plumage. Adults have buff and grayish grizzled lores and a thin buffy white supercilium on an otherwise grayish face. Their forecrown is rufous with black streaks and their rear crown, back, rump, and tail are olive-gray. Their wings are dusky with gray-brown coverts and thin medium brown edges to the flight feathers. Their underparts are creamy white with blurry gray streaks. Their iris is gray-brown, their maxilla slate gray to black, their mandible creamy to pale gray, and their legs and feet olive-brown. Juveniles differ from adults by having gray bars rather than streaks on their underparts.

== Distribution and habitat ==
The equatorial greytail is found in the foothills of the east side of the Andes from Ecuador's Napo Province south slightly into northern Peru. It inhabits the interior and edges of humid montane forest. In elevation it ranges from 1,000 to 1,600 m (3,300 to 5,200 ft) in Ecuador and 1,050 to 1,700 m (3,400 to 5,600 ft) in Peru.

== Behavior ==
=== Movement ===
The equatorial greytail is a year-round resident throughout its range.

=== Feeding ===
The equatorial greytail feeds on arthropods. It forages high in the forest's subcanopy and canopy. It forages singly, in pairs, and in small family groups and readily joins mixed-species feeding flocks. It gleans prey from foliage live and dead, sometimes hanging upside down on the underside of leaves, and also gleans from twigs and small branches.

=== Breeding ===
The equatorial greytail's breeding season appears to start with nest building in January. The nest is a large ball of sticks suspended from a branch. Nothing else is known about its breeding biology.

=== Vocalization ===
The equatorial greytail's song is "a long and dry, almost insect-like and somewhat reeling trill that lasts 5 or more seconds, 'tzzzzzzzzzzzzzzzz' ". Its call is a dry "tsit".

== Status ==
The IUCN has assessed the equatorial greytail as Near Threatened. It is scarce and local in its somewhat limited range; its population size is not known and is believed to be decreasing. "Its habitats are under intense pressure from conversion to agriculture and cattle pasture, mining operations and logging, with widespread destruction caused by peasant farmers, and tea and coffee growers."
