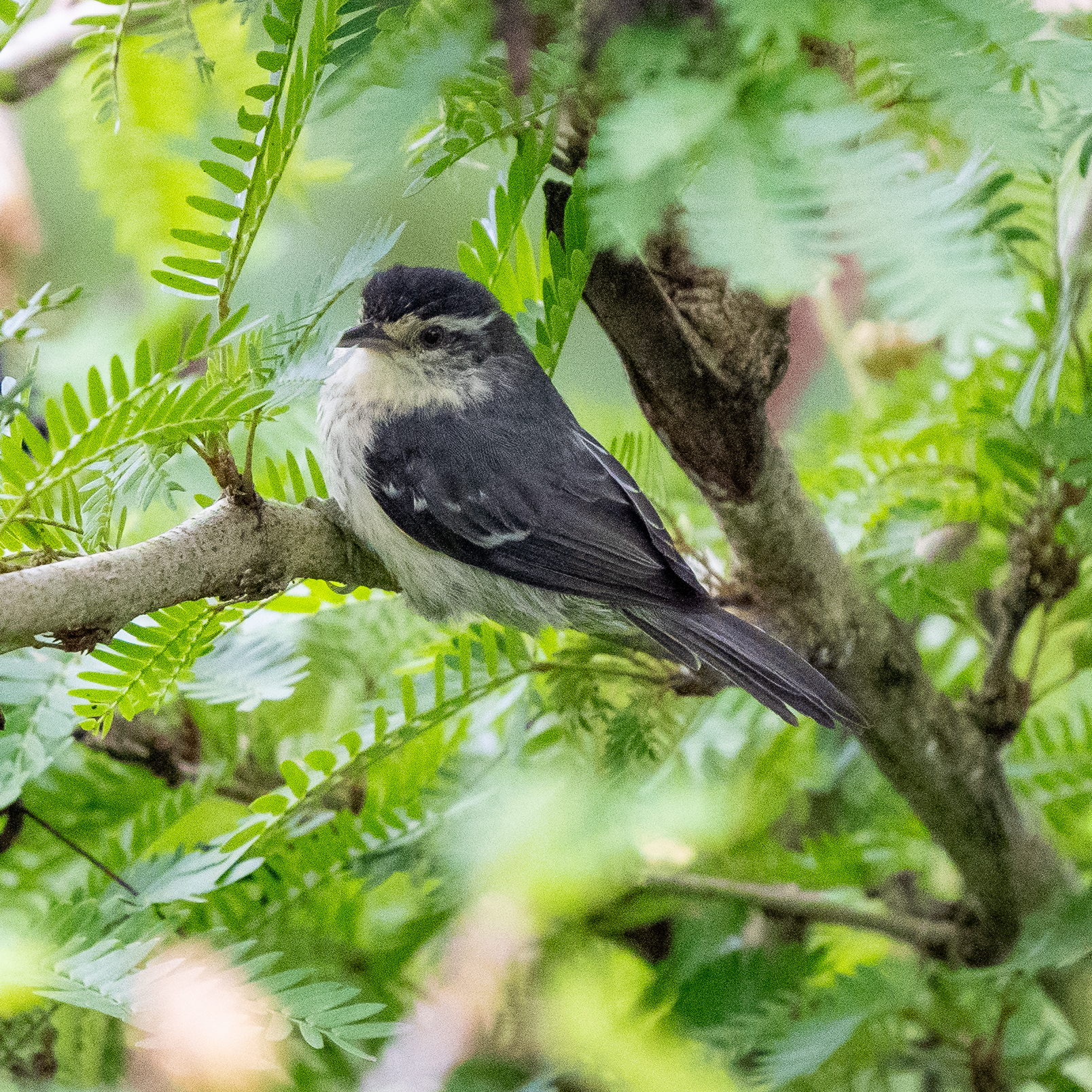

Conservation status
- Least Concern (IUCN 3.1)

Scientific classification
- Kingdom: Animalia
- Phylum: Chordata
- Class: Aves
- Order: Passeriformes
- Family: Furnariidae
- Genus: Xenerpestes
- Species: X. minlosi

Binomial name
- Xenerpestes minlosi Berlepsch, 1886

= Double-banded greytail =

Species of bird

The double-banded greytail (Xenerpestes minlosi) is a species of bird in the Furnariinae subfamily of the ovenbird family Furnariidae. It is found in Colombia, Ecuador, and Panama.

== Taxonomy and systematics ==
The double-banded greytail has two subspecies, the nominate X. m. minlosi (Berlepsch, 1886) and X. m. umbraticus (Wetmore, 1951). It shares genus Xenerpestes with the equatorial greytail (X. singularis) and together they are sister species to the orange-fronted plushcrown (Metopothrix aurantiaca).

== Description ==
The double-banded greytail is 11 to 12 cm (4.3 to 4.7 in) long. It is a tiny furnariid that resembles a warbler. The sexes have the same plumage. Adults of the nominate subspecies have olive-buff lores, a creamy white supercilium, and a dark gray line behind the eye on an otherwise grayish face. Their crown is blackish and their back, rump, and tail are dark gray. Their wings are dark gray with yellowish at the bend and two white bars on the coverts. Their throat and underparts are creamy whitish with some grayish flecks on the breast and olive-buff undertail coverts. Their iris is light brown, their maxilla dark brown, their mandible grayish white, and their legs and feet grayish brown. Juveniles have a less distinct supercilium than adults, with grayer underparts and no wingbars. Subspecies X. m. umbraticus has darker upperparts, wings, and tail than the nominate.

== Distribution and habitat ==
The nominate subspecies of the double-banded greytail is found in Colombia from near the Caribbean coast into the Magdalena River Valley as far south as Boyacá and Santander departments. Subspecies X. m. umbraticus is found in eastern Panama's Darién Province and south through western Colombia into northwestern Ecuador's Esmeraldas and Pichincha provinces. It is rare and local in Ecuador. The species inhabits lowland and foothill evergreen forest, both primary and mature secondary. In elevation it ranges from near sea level to 900 m (3,000 ft) though it reaches only about 500 m (1,600 ft) in Ecuador.

== Behavior ==
=== Movement ===
The double-banded greytail is a year-round resident throughout its range.

=== Feeding ===
The double-banded greytail feeds on arthropods. It forages singly or in pairs and readily joins mixed-species feeding flocks. It forages from the forest's midstorey to its canopy, especially in dense tangles of vines. It gleans prey from foliage live and dead, often hanging upside down on the underside of leaves, and also gleans from twigs and sometimes flowers.

=== Breeding ===
Nothing is known about the double-banded greytail's breeding biology.

=== Vocalization ===
The double-banded greytail's song is "a long, dry, extremely rapid chattering trill on the same pitch, increasing in volume". Its call is "a sharp, thin, inflected note".

== Status ==
The IUCN has assessed the double-banded greytail as being of Least Concern. It has a large range and an estimated population of at least 50,000 mature individuals, though the latter is believed to be decreasing. No immediate threats have been identified. It is considered rare to locally uncommon "but this may be in part a reflection of the difficulty in detecting this species".
