= Flag of Amazonas =

The Flag of Amazonas may refer to:

- Flag of Amazonas (Brazilian state), the flag of the Brazilian state of Amazonas
- Flag of Amazonas (Colombian department), the flag of the Colombian department of Amazonas
- Flag of Amazonas (Peruvian department), the flag of the Peruvian department of Amazonas
- Flag of Amazonas (Venezuelan state), the flag of the Venezuelan state of Amazonas
