= Trygg Mammamedisin =

Norwegian health service

Trygg mammamedisin ('Safe Mommy Medicine') is a public service in Norway which gives individual advice about medical drugs to pregnant and breastfeeding women. The service is web-based, and is funded by the Ministry of Health and Care Services. Trygg mammamedisin is managed by RELIS - Regional Drug Information Centres. These centres are a publicly funded service for health professionals, offering producer-independent information about medical drugs. The answers provided in Trygg mammamedisin are generated by RELIS employees, who are all certified pharmacists or medical doctors working at the University Hospital of North Norway, Haukeland University Hospital, St. Olav's University Hospital and Oslo University Hospital.

Trygg Mammamedisin was launched in June 2011.
