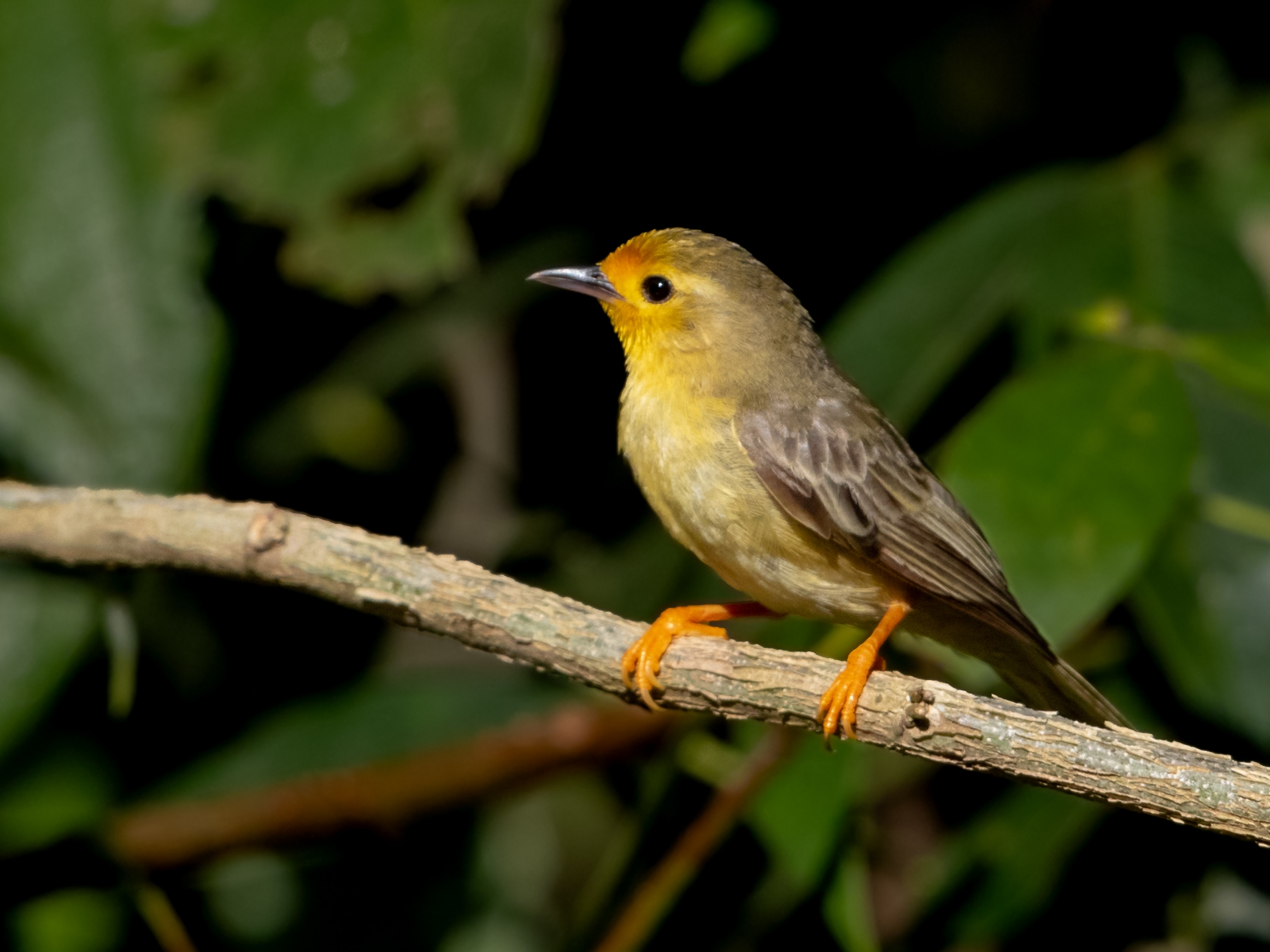

Conservation status
- Least Concern (IUCN 3.1)

Scientific classification
- Kingdom: Animalia
- Phylum: Chordata
- Class: Aves
- Order: Passeriformes
- Family: Furnariidae
- Genus: Metopothrix; Sclater, PL & Salvin, 1866
- Species: M. aurantiaca

Binomial name
- Metopothrix aurantiaca Sclater, PL & Salvin, 1866

= Orange-fronted plushcrown =

Species of bird

The orange-fronted plushcrown (Metopothrix aurantiaca) is a species of bird in the Furnariinae subfamily of the ovenbird family Furnariidae. It is found in Bolivia, Brazil, Colombia, Ecuador, and Peru.

== Taxonomy and systematics ==
The orange-fronted plushcrown is the only member of its genus and has no subspecies. Its plumage is so unlike that of most members of family Furnariidae that many authors have questioned whether it belongs there. Genetic data show that it and the two species of genus Xenerpestes are sisters, and they in turn are sisters to the pink-legged graveteiro (Acrobatornis fonsecai).

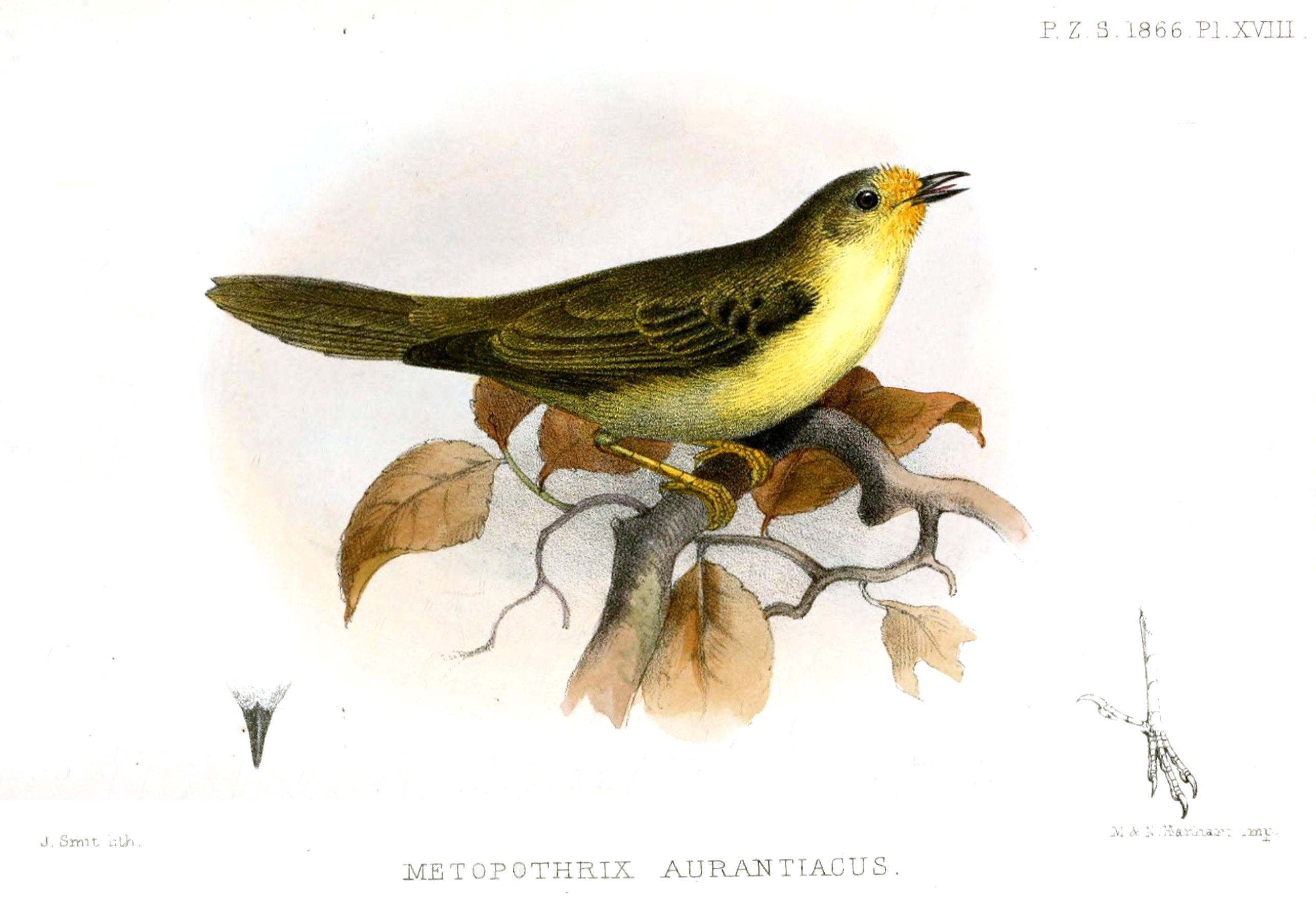
At Ramal do Noca, Rio Branco, Acre, Brazil

== Description ==
The orange-fronted plushcrown is 11 to 12 cm (4.3 to 4.7 in) long and weighs 10 to 12 g (0.35 to 0.42 oz). The sexes have the same plumage. Adults have an orange forehead ("front") and yellow lores, eyering, and supercilium; the last becomes greenish yellow behind the eye. They have a faint greenish olive line through the eye and greenish olive ear coverts. Their crown, back, rump, and tail are greenish olive, with the rump being somewhat paler. The "plush" of the crown is usually not apparent in the field. Their wings are dark olive fuscous with pale yellow edges on the coverts and flight feathers. Their throat is yellow and the rest of their underparts are dull yellowish green that is slightly paler on the belly. Their iris is brown to dark brown to gray, their maxilla black, their mandible black to gray, and their legs and feet bright yellow-orange to yellow. Juveniles have little or no orange and yellow on their face. It is the only species of furnariid with yellow/greenish plumage and yellow legs, in which it resembles a tanager or warbler.

== Distribution and habitat ==
The orange-fronted plushcrown is found in southeastern Colombia's Putumayo and Amazonas departments, eastern Ecuador and Peru, Beni Department in northeastern Bolivia, and from them into western Brazil east to the lower Juruá and upper Purus rivers. It inhabits forest along rivers and islands in them, mature secondary forest, and the edges of clearings in várzea and terra firme forest. It is seldom far from a river. In elevation it generally ranges from 150 to 650 m (490 to 2,100 ft); in Colombia it reaches only 500 m (1,600 ft).

== Behavior ==
=== Movement ===
The orange-fronted plushcrown is a year-round resident throughout its range.

=== Feeding ===
The orange-fronted plushcrown feeds mostly on arthropods and has once been observed feeding on fruit. It typically forages in pairs or small groups that are thought to be families, and occasionally joins mixed-species feeding flocks. It usually forages from the forest's mid-storey to its canopy, gleaning prey from leaves and twigs often by hanging acrobatically from them.

=== Breeding ===
The orange-fronted plushcrown's breeding season has not been defined but appears to start with nest building in January. Its nest is a large ball of sticks with a side entrance placed in a tree, typically between 4 and 20 m (13 and 66 ft) above the ground. Nothing else is known about its breeding biology.

=== Vocalization ===
The orange-fronted plushcrown's song is a descending series of three to five high thin notes. Its call is a thin "tsweet-tsweet".

== Status ==
The IUCN has assessed the orange-fronted plushcrown as being of Least Concern. It has a very large range and an unknown population size that is believed to be stable. No immediate threats have been identified. It is considered generally uncommon but locally common and occurs in several protected areas. It might "benefit from limited deforestation, resulting in increasing its preferred edge habitats".
