= Puerto Alegría =

- Municipality and town
- Location of the municipality and town of Puerto Alegría in the Amazonas Department of Colombia

- Location in Colombia
- Coordinates: 1°02′S 74°02′W
- Country: Colombia
- Department: Amazonas Department

Population (2005)
  - Total: 1,277
- Time zone: UTC-5 (Colombia Standard Time)
- Climate: Af

Puerto Alegría (Spanish pronunciation: [ˈpweɾto aleˈɣɾi.a]) is a town and municipality in the Colombian Department of Amazonas. Puerto Alegria was founded by Orlando Benjumea and Reinaldo Martínez, and officially recognized by the Colombian government as a municipality on January 1, 1981. The area contributes to Colombia's agricultural industry with its cultivation of yucca, corn, plantains, fruits, and avocado farms; it also produces livestock such as laying hens, cows, and pigs. The town of Puerto Alegria has a population of 1,531 people, and has a population density of just 0.2/ km^{2} . In 2005, the population was 1,277. Overall, it has a land area of 8,774.00 square kilometres or 3,387.66 square miles and lies an altitude of 156 metres or 512 feet above sea level. Ingrid Camacho Nini Stella is the town's mayor.

== Climate ==
Puerto Alegría has a tropical rainforest climate (Köppen Af) with heavy to very heavy rainfall year-round.

Climate data for Puerto Alegría
Month	Jan	Feb	Mar	Apr	May	Jun	Jul	Aug	Sep	Oct	Nov	Dec	Year
Mean daily maximum °C (°F)	31.7 (89.1)	31.6 (88.9)	31.4 (88.5)	31.1 (88.0)	30.9 (87.6)	29.4 (84.9)	29.1 (84.4)	30.6 (87.1)	31.1 (88.0)	30.5 (86.9)	31.3 (88.3)	31.2 (88.2)	30.8 (87.5)
Daily mean °C (°F)	27.1 (80.8)	26.7 (80.1)	26.6 (79.9)	26.5 (79.7)	26.6 (79.9)	25.4 (77.7)	24.9 (76.8)	25.6 (78.1)	26.0 (78.8)	26.3 (79.3)	27.2 (81.0)	26.5 (79.7)	26.3 (79.3)
Mean daily minimum °C (°F)	22.5 (72.5)	21.9 (71.4)	21.9 (71.4)	21.9 (71.4)	22.4 (72.3)	21.4 (70.5)	20.8 (69.4)	20.7 (69.3)	21.0 (69.8)	22.1 (71.8)	23.1 (73.6)	21.9 (71.4)	21.8 (71.2)
Average rainfall mm (inches)	188.6 (7.43)	256.1 (10.08)	314.7 (12.39)	376.3 (14.81)	398.7 (15.70)	362.5 (14.27)	337.5 (13.29)	276.2 (10.87)	281.6 (11.09)	262.6 (10.34)	263.3 (10.37)	273.0 (10.75)	3,591.1 (141.39)
Average rainy days (≥ 1 mm)	12	13	16	17	20	19	17	15	15	14	14	13	185
Source 1: IDEAM
Source 2: Climate-Data.org
