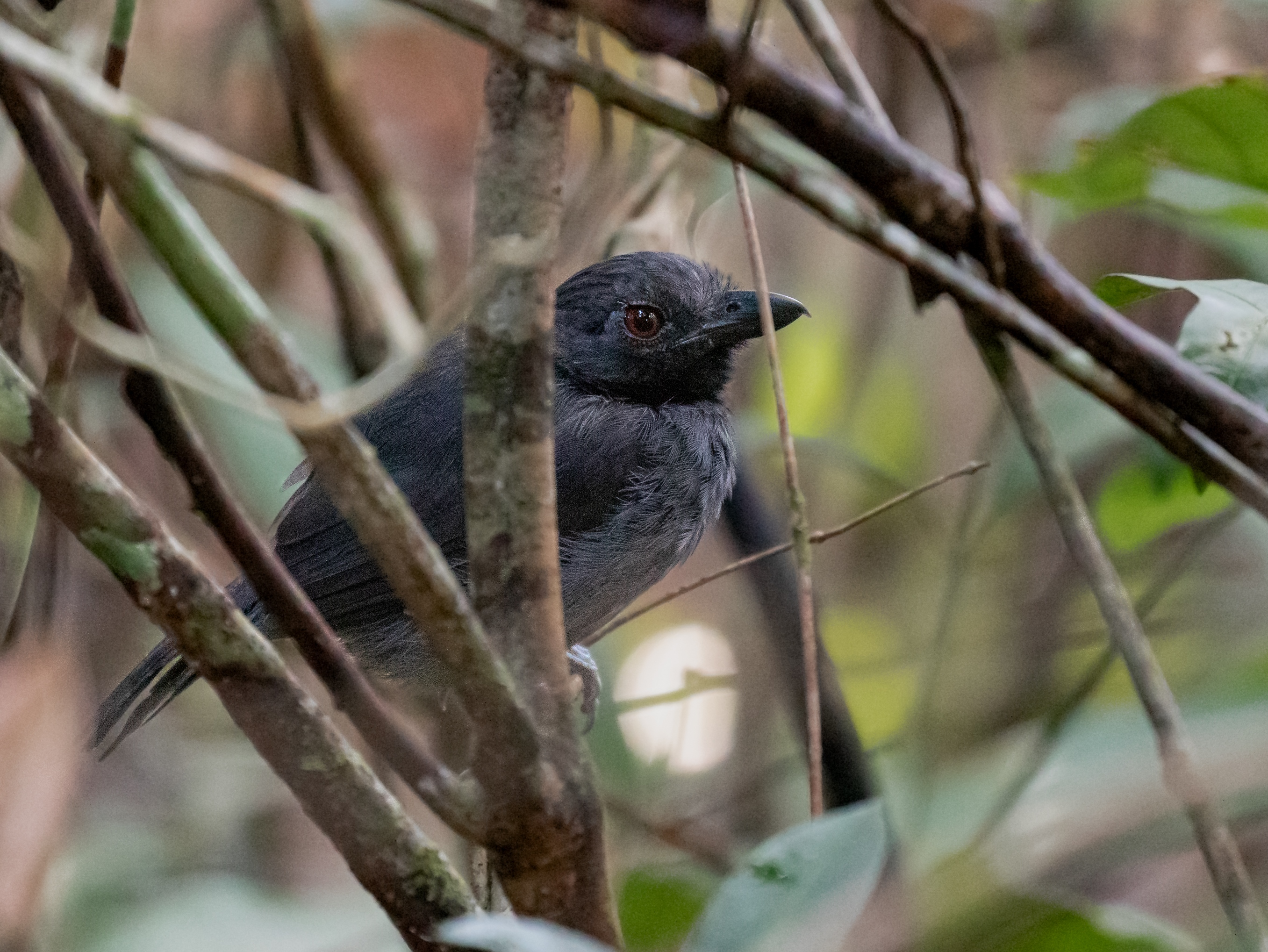

Scientific classification
- Kingdom: Animalia
- Phylum: Chordata
- Class: Aves
- Order: Passeriformes
- Family: Thamnophilidae
- Genus: Frederickena; Chubb, 1918

Type species
- Thamnophilus viridis Vieillot, 1816

= Frederickena =

Genus of birds

Frederickena is a genus of passerine birds in the antbird family, Thamnophilidae. These are among the largest antbirds, and are native to the Guianas and Amazon rainforest in South America. They are infrequently seen and generally found at very low densities.

The genus contains three species:

- Black-throated antshrike, Frederickena viridis
- Undulated antshrike, Frederickena unduliger
- Fulvous antshrike, Frederickena fulva

The fulvous antshrike was previously considered as a subspecies of the undulated antshrike but was promoted to species status based on a 2009 study of the vocalization.
