= COVID-19 vaccination in Norway =

COVID-19 immunization campaign

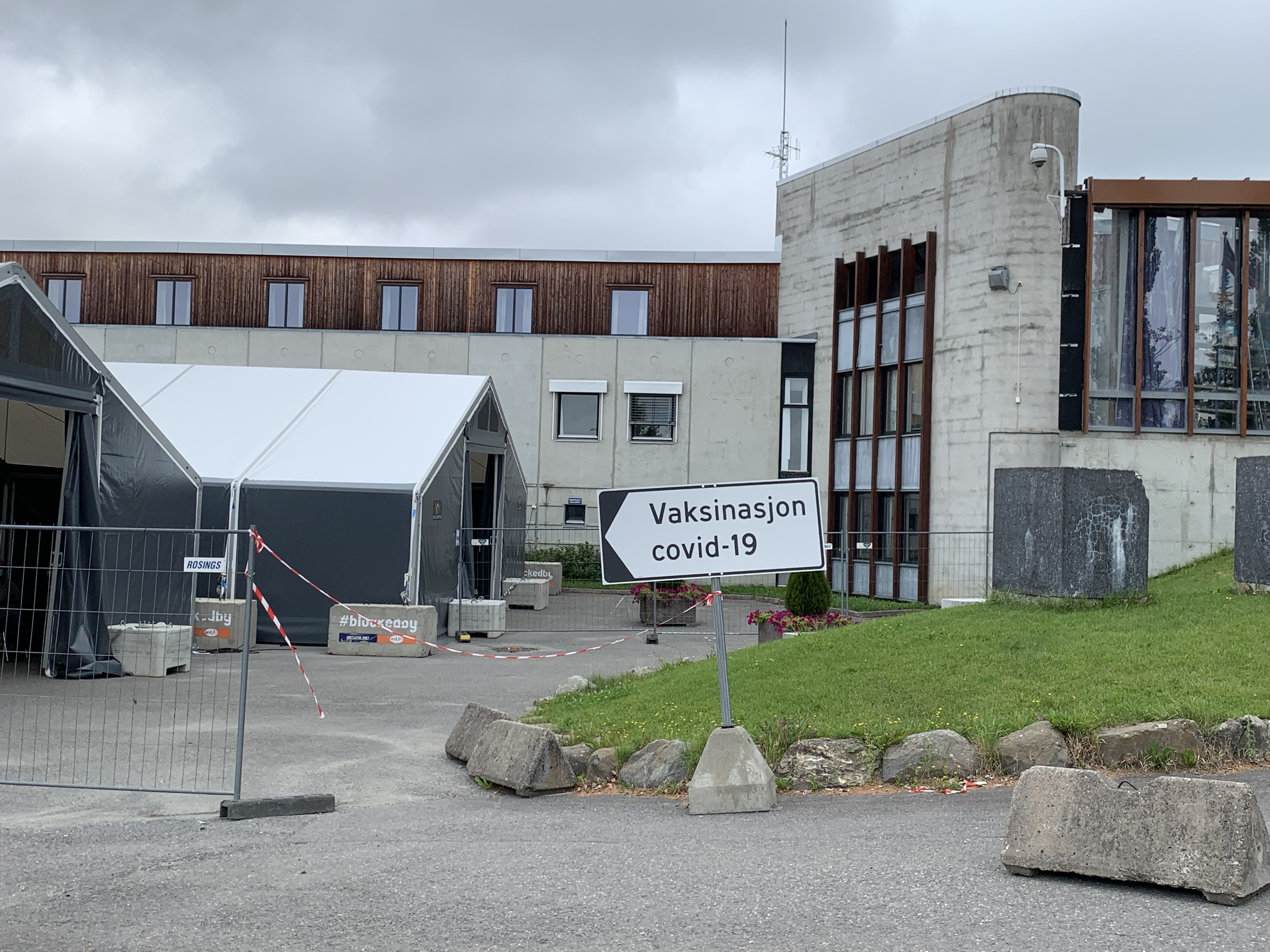
- COVID-19 vaccination site in Hamar
- Date: 27 December 2020 – present
- Location: Norway
- Cause: COVID-19 pandemic in Norway

COVID-19 vaccination in Norway is an ongoing immunization campaign against severe acute respiratory syndrome coronavirus 2 (SARS-CoV-2), the virus that causes coronavirus disease 2019 (COVID-19), in response to the ongoing pandemic in the country. As of 21 June 2022 80.5% of the population have been vaccinated with the first dose, 75.1% with the second dose and 55.9% with at least one additional dose (also known as booster doses). As of 09 March 2023, a total of 14,443,131 vaccine doses has been distributed in Norway.

As of January 2022 the country offers both the Pfizer-BioNTech and Moderna vaccine for the population over 18 years old. It is possible for the population to choose the vaccine they want, and it is also possible to take different vaccines for the different doses. However, children under 18 years old are only given the Pfizer-BioNTech vaccine. The children under 15 years old need parental approval to be vaccinated, and they only get 1 dose of the Pfizer-BioTech vaccine. If they have some serious sickness, they may also get 2 doses. Only the children between 5 and 11 years old that have some serious sickness, will be offered the vaccine. Men between 18 and 30 years old are also recommended to choose to take the Pfizer-BioNTech due to the higher risk of getting myocarditis and pericarditis with the Moderna vaccine.

Norway is also closely monitoring side effects, with both reports from healthcare professionals and the public being registered in a common database. This should allow for a good overview of the situation once the vaccine is distributed in the general population, as well as an efficient collaboration with other countries.

In May 2021, an expert review commissioned by the Norwegian Medicines Agency to investigate "the cause of the first 100 reported deaths of nursing home residents who had received the Pfizer-BioNTech vaccine" concluded that "a causal link between the Pfizer-BioNTech vaccine and death was considered "likely" in 10 of the 100 cases, "possible" in 26 cases, and "unlikely" in 59 cases. The remaining five were deemed "unclassifiable.""

== Vaccines on order ==
There are several COVID-19 vaccines at various stages of development around the world.

Vaccine	Approval	Deployment
Pfizer–BioNTech	21 December 2020	27 December 2020
Moderna	6 January 2021	12 January 2021
Oxford-AstraZeneca	29 January 2021	7 February 2021
Janssen	11 March 2021	5 May 2021
Novavax	20 December 2021	Pending
CureVac	Pending	Pending
Valneva	Pending	Pending
Sanofi–GSK	Pending	Pending
