= La Victoria, Amazonas =

La Victoria
- Municipality and town
- Location of the municipality and town of La Victoria, Amazonas in the Amazonas Department of Colombia

- Location in Colombia
- Coordinates: 0°3′5″N 71°13′22″W
- Country: Colombia
- Department: Amazonas Department
- Time zone: UTC-5 (Colombia Standard Time)
- Climate: Af

La Victoria is a town and municipality in the southern Colombian department of Amazonas. It features a tropical rainforest climate (Af).
