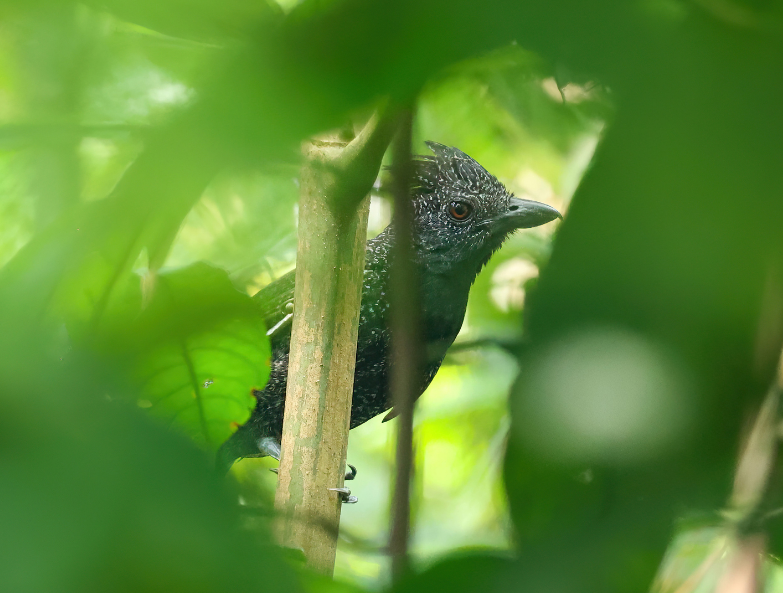

Scientific classification
- Kingdom: Animalia
- Phylum: Chordata
- Class: Aves
- Order: Passeriformes
- Family: Thamnophilidae
- Genus: Frederickena
- Species: F. fulva

Binomial name
- Frederickena fulva Zimmer, 1944

Synonyms
- Frederickena unduliger fulva

= Fulvous antshrike =

Species of bird

The fulvous antshrike (Frederickena fulva) is a species of bird in subfamily Thamnophilinae of family Thamnophilidae, the "typical antbirds". It is found in Colombia, Ecuador, and Peru.

== Taxonomy ==
The fulvous antshrike's taxonomy is unresolved. The South American Classification Committee of the American Ornithological Society (SACC), the International Ornithological Committee, and the Clements taxonomy treat it as a full species. BirdLife International's Handbook of the Birds of the World (HBW) treats the taxon as a subspecies of the undulated antshrike (F. unduliger). The fulvous antshrike is monotypic.

== Description ==
The fulvous antshrike is a large dark antbird, 22 to 25 cm (8.7 to 9.8 in) long and weighing 75 to 85 g (2.6 to 3.0 oz). The species exhibits significant sexual dimorphism, though both sexes have a crest, a brown to orange-yellow iris, a heavy black bill with a hook at the end like true shrikes, and black or dark gray legs and feet. Adult males are mostly black with irregular thin white bars everywhere but the throat. The bars on the face and crest are broken and appear as small spots. Adult females are mostly rich cinnamon with wavy black bars; their forehead and crest are darker cinnamon-rufous with black bars and their tail and uppertail coverts are black with thin gray bars.

== Distribution and habitat ==
The fulvous antshrike is a bird of the far western Amazon Basin. It is found in southern Colombia's departments of Caquetá, Putumayo, and Amazonas; in the eastern half of Ecuador; and in northern Peru south at least to the Río Marañón and perhaps further to the rios Ucayali and Cushabatay. Though some maps show its range extending into far western Brazil, the SACC has no records from that country. Sightings are sparse except in northeastern Ecuador. It inhabits lowland evergreen forest such as terra firme. It greatly favors dense, viny, vegetation in the understorey, especially at openings such as those formed by fallen trees and along watercourses. In elevation it ranges up to about 700 m (2,300 ft) in most of its range but may reach 1,100 m (3,600 ft) in Peru.

== Behavior ==
=== Movement ===
The fulvous antshrike is presumed to be a year-round resident throughout its range.

=== Feeding ===
The fulvous antshrike's diet has not been detailed but is assumed to include large insects and other arthropods. It forages singly or in pairs in dense foliage and vine tangles, mostly near the ground. It hops from branch to branch and reaches and hops to glean prey. It typically jerks its tail sideways while foraging. It occasionally joins mixed-species feeding flocks that pass through its territory, and there is only one record of it following an army ant swarm.

=== Breeding ===
Only one study has been made of the fulvous antshrike's breeding biology. The only known nest was discovered in eastern Ecuador; it held two eggs that hatched in late June. They were pale creamy white with cinnamon and lavender markings. The nest was a large open cup woven mostly of rootlets and lined with some finer fibers; it was suspended between two parallel branches 1.6 m (5 ft) above the ground in a small sapling. Both parents incubated the eggs during the day and the female alone at night. Both parents provisioned the nestlings. The incubation period, time to fledging, and other details of parental care are not known.

=== Vocalization ===
The fulvous antshrike's song is "a steadily repeated series of whistled notes, 'uué, uué, uué...' ". It has several calls. The most common is "a long...nasal, downward-inflected snarl variously expressed as churr, charrr, chakeeer, or mEw'urrr". Others are a "descending squeal described as peeeeeeh or peeeeeeyargh" and " a loud, repeated chee-chee-chee-chee-chee".

== Status ==
The IUCN follows HBW taxonomy and so does not separately assess the fulvous antshrike from the undulated antshrike. It is considered uncommon in Colombia, rare and local in Ecuador, and rare to uncommon in Peru. It occurs in at least three protected areas. "No effects of human activity have been specifically documented, but given its dependence on mature forests, the Fulvous Antshrike is undoubtedly adversely impacted by habitat fragmentation and other anthropogenic habitat alteration."
