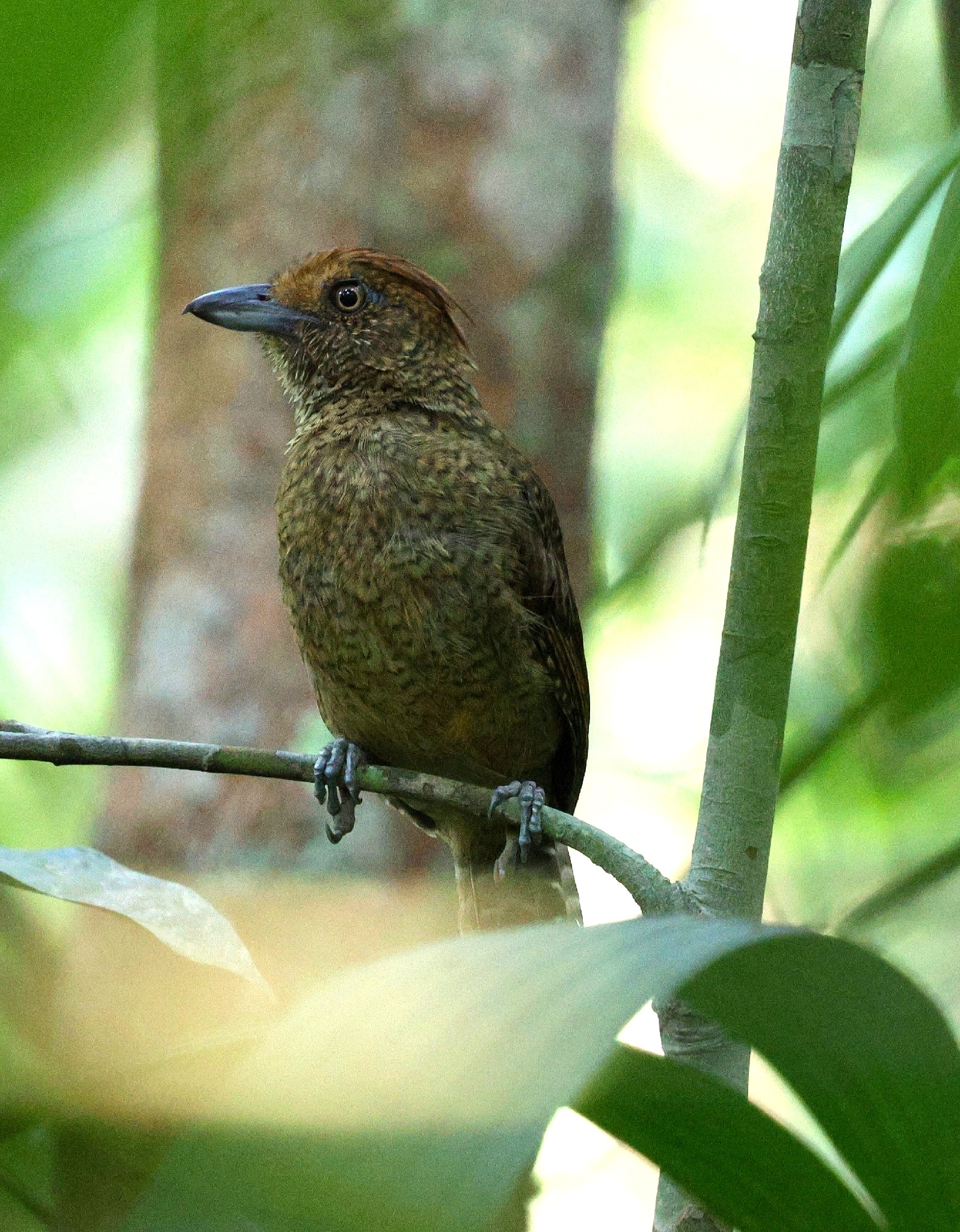

Conservation status
- Least Concern (IUCN 3.1)

Scientific classification
- Kingdom: Animalia
- Phylum: Chordata
- Class: Aves
- Order: Passeriformes
- Family: Thamnophilidae
- Genus: Frederickena
- Species: F. unduliger

Binomial name
- Frederickena unduliger (Pelzeln, 1868)
- Range of combined undulated and fulvous antshrikes (see taxonomy section)

= Undulated antshrike =

Species of bird

The undulated antshrike (Frederickena unduliger) is a species of bird in subfamily Thamnophilinae of family Thamnophilidae, the "typical antbirds". It is found in Bolivia, Brazil, and Peru.

== Taxonomy and systematics ==
The undulated antshrike was described by the Austrian ornithologist August von Pelzeln in 1868 and given the binomial name Thamnophilus unduliger.

The undulated antshrike's taxonomy is unresolved. The South American Classification Committee of the American Ornithological Society, the International Ornithological Committee, and the Clements taxonomy assign it three subspecies, the nominate F. u. unduliger (Pelzeln, 1868), F. u. diversa (Zimmer, JT, 1944), and F. u. pallida (Zimmer, JT, 1944). BirdLife International's Handbook of the Birds of the World (HBW) includes a fourth subspecies, F. u. fulva (Zimmer, JT, 1944) that the other taxonomies recognize as a full species, the fulvous antshrike.

== Description ==
The undulated antshrike is a large dark antbird, 22 to 25 cm (8.7 to 9.8 in) long and weighing 75 to 85 g (2.6 to 3.0 oz). The species exhibits significant sexual dimorphism, though both sexes of all subspecies have a crest, a brown to pale yellow iris, a heavy black bill with a hook at the end like true shrikes, and black legs and feet. Adult males of all three subspecies are mostly black with irregular thin white bars everywhere but the throat. Adult females of the nominate subspecies are mostly cinnamon with wavy black bars; their forehead and crest are rufous and black and their tail is black with thin gray bars. Females of subspecies F. u. pallida are paler overall than the nominate and have no bars on their mantle and their underparts. Females of F. u. diversa are intermediate between the other two.

== Distribution and habitat ==
The undulated antshrike is a bird of the western Amazon Basin. The nominate subspecies is found in northwestern Brazil along the upper Rio Negro and possibly as far south as the Rio Solimões (upper Amazon). Subspecies F. u. diversa is found from eastern Peru south of the rios Amazon and Marañón east into Brazil as far as the Rio Juruá and south into northwestern Bolivia as far as southern La Paz and Beni departments. F. u. pallida is found in Brazil south of the Amazon between the rios Purus and Madeira, and probably south into the eastern part of north-central Bolivia's Pando Department.

The undulated antshrike inhabits lowland evergreen forest such as terra firme. It greatly favors dense, viny, vegetation in the understorey, especially at openings such as those formed by fallen trees and along watercourses. In elevation it ranges up to about 1,100 m (3,600 ft).

== Behavior ==
=== Movement ===
The undulated antshrike is presumed to be a year-round resident throughout its range.

=== Feeding ===
The undulated antshrike's diet has not been detailed but is assumed to include large insects and other arthropods. It forages singly or in pairs in dense foliage and vine tangles, mostly on the ground and up to about 3 m (10 ft) above it. It hops from branch to branch and along the ground to find prey. It typically jerks its tail sideways while foraging. It occasionally joins mixed-species feeding flocks that pass through its territory.

=== Breeding ===
Only one study has been made of the undulated antshrike's breeding biology; three nests were observed. Its nesting season in Peru included October and November. The nests were a large woven cup. The three nests each had two eggs that were white with purplish markings. Both parents incubated the eggs during the day and the female alone at night. Both parents provisioned the nestlings. The incubation period, time to fledging, and other details of parental care are not known.

=== Vocalization ===
The song of the undulated antshrike's subspecies F. u. diversa is a "short series of 8-13 directly connected 'wuiw' notes, increasing in strength and pitch". The songs of the other two subspecies are not known well though they apparently differ from that of diversa. What is thought to be a typical call is "a long (e.g. 1 second), nasal, downward-inflected churr" written as "TCHEErrrrl". Other calls that may be from different populations are "a squeal followed by a sharp note" and a "short scratchy call repeated in short series".

== Status ==
The IUCN follows HBW taxonomy and so includes the fulvous antshrike in its assessement of the undulated antshrike, and together they are assessed as being of Least Concern. It has a large range; its population size is not known and is believed to be decreasing. No immediate threats have been identified. The undulated antshrike is considered uncommon to rare in most of its range. It occurs in several large protected areas and its range "includes vast areas of intact suitable habitat". "This antshrike is probably an indicator of high-quality forest, as it is generally absent from disturbed areas."
