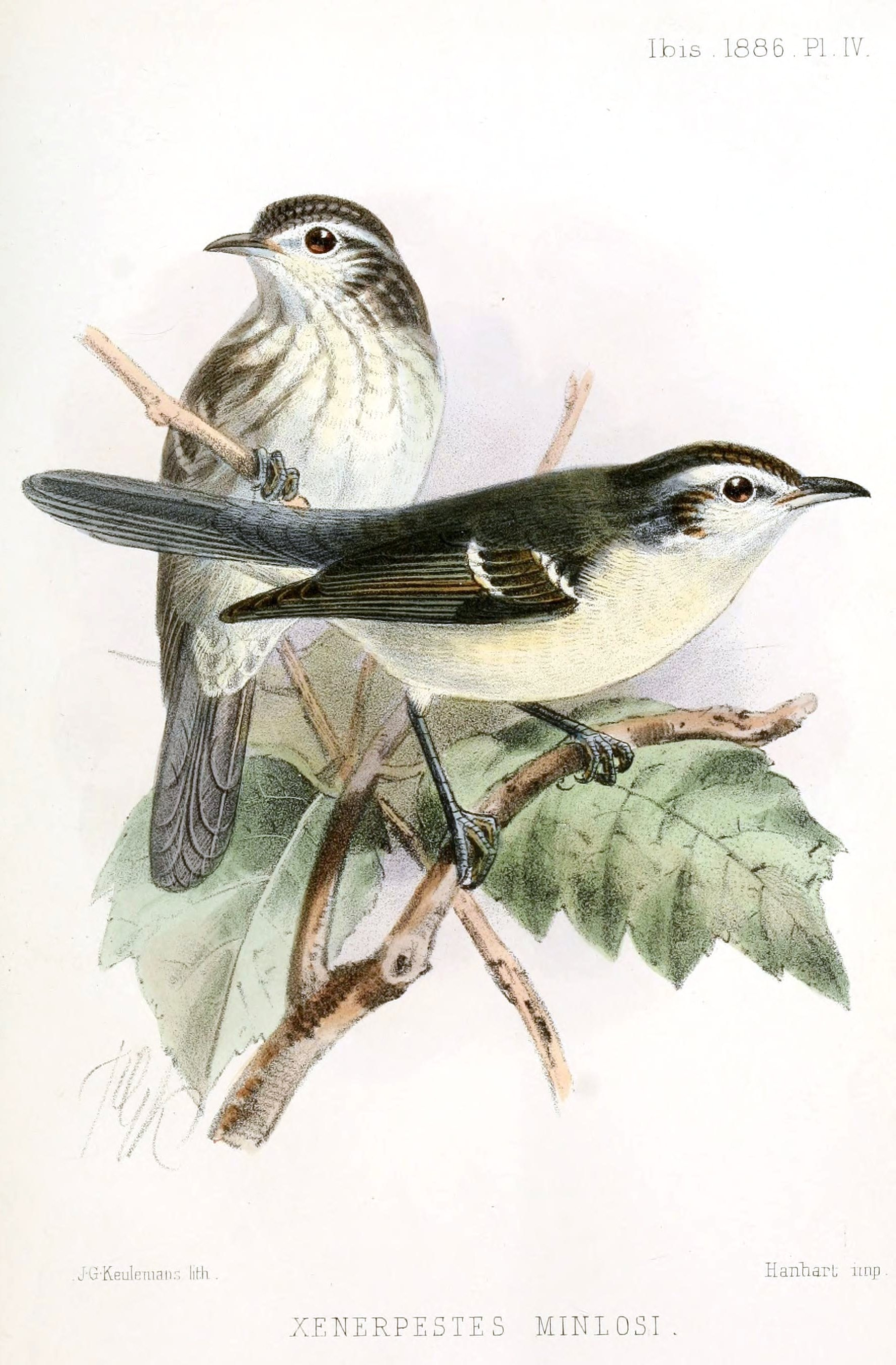
- Double-banded greytail, Xenerpestes minlosi

Scientific classification
- Kingdom: Animalia
- Phylum: Chordata
- Class: Aves
- Order: Passeriformes
- Family: Furnariidae
- Genus: Xenerpestes; Berlepsch, 1886

Type species
- Xenerpestes minlosi von Berlepsch, 1886

Species
- Xenerpestes minlosi Xenerpestes singularis

= Xenerpestes =

Genus of birds

Xenerpestes is the genus of greytails, birds in the family Furnariidae. It contains the following species:

- Equatorial greytail, Xenerpestes singularis
- Double-banded greytail, Xenerpestes minlosi
