= Flag of Amazonas Department =

Amazonas Department
- Use: Civil and state flag
- Proportion: 13:21
- Adopted: August 21, 1974
- Design: Rectangular defaced black-fimbriated horizontal triband tricolour of unequal sizes in green, yellow (mustard), and white, charged with an indigenous warrior charging a bow and arrow, a pouncing jaguar, and a five-pointed star all in black.

The state flag of Amazonas Department was officially adopted by means of the Commissarial Decree Nº 090 of August 21, 1974.

== Design ==
The dimensions of the flag are 2.10 meters in length by 1.30 meters in width. The green top stripe is 90 cm in width, the yellow mustard stripe is 8 cm with two fimbriated stripes in black 0.5 cm each, and the white stripe is 32 cm. The flag is defaced by three charges all in sable. The Indian represents the people of Amazonas, the jaguar its fauna and natural resources, and the star represents the capital city of Leticia.

Charges of the flag of Amazonas Department
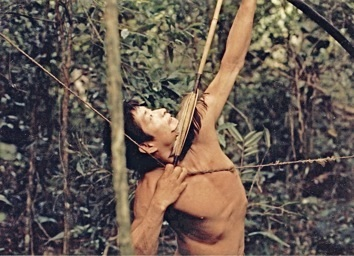
A 29 cm long by 23 cm tall indigenous warrior/hunter charging a bow and arrow.

A 37 cm long by 15 cm tall pouncing jaguar.

The Gubernatorial Flag is not defaced but charged with the coat of arms of Amazonas Department in the centre of the upper band and it serves as the Governor's Standard.

== See also ==
- Coat of arms of the Department of Amazonas
