= Puerto Nariño =

- Municipality and town
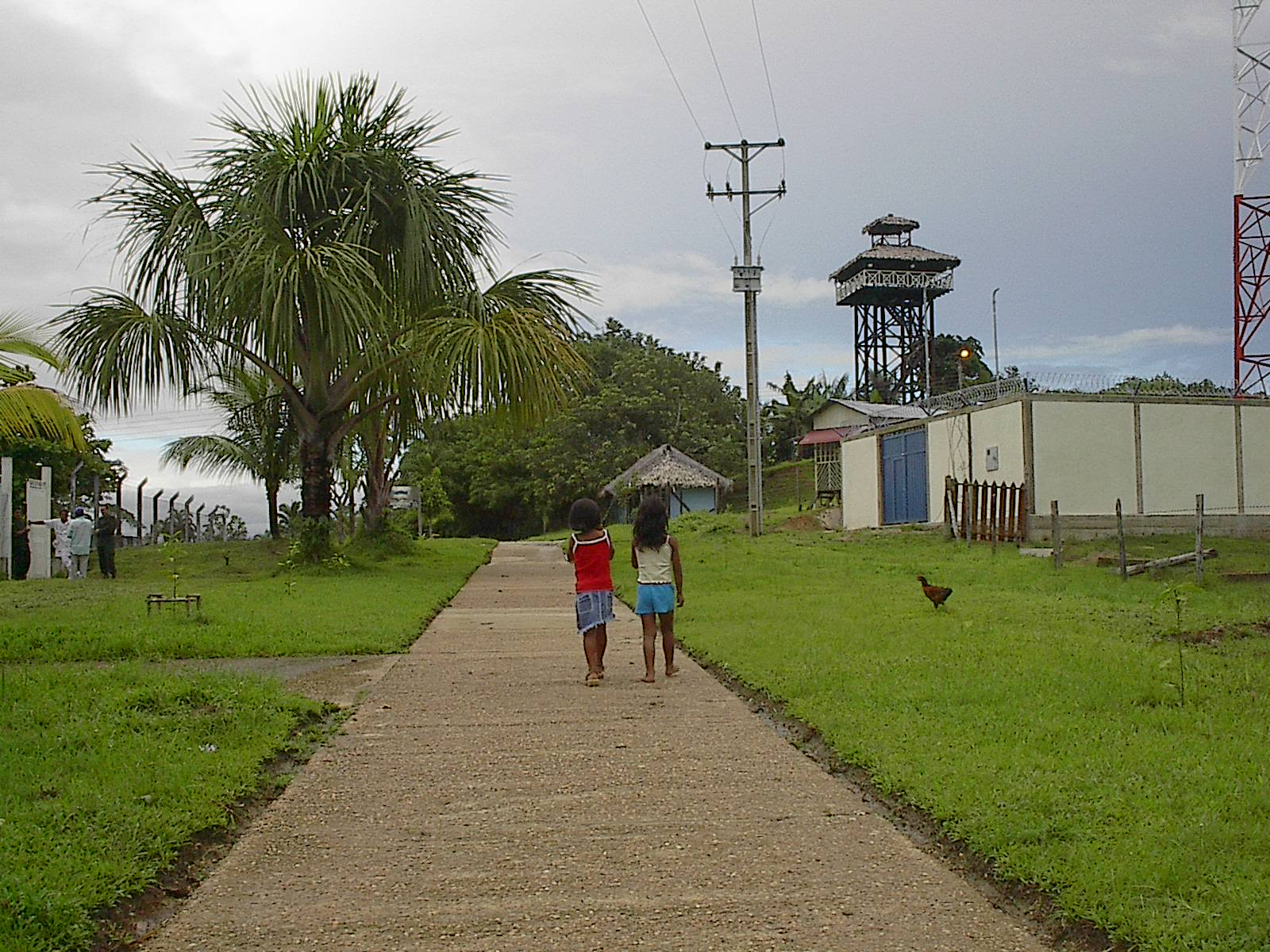

- Flag Coat of arms

- Location of the municipality and town of Puerto Nariño in the Amazonas Department of Colombia

- Location in Colombia
- Coordinates: 3°46′24″S 70°22′55″W
- Country: Colombia
- Department: Amazonas Department

Area
  - Total: 1,876 km^{2} (724 sq mi)
- Time zone: UTC-5 (Colombia Standard Time)
- Climate: Af

Puerto Nariño is the second municipality of the Amazonas department of Colombia, located on the shore of the Amazon River.

Puerto Nariño coves an area of 1,876 km^{2} (724 sq mi). It has about 6,000 residents.

== Geography ==
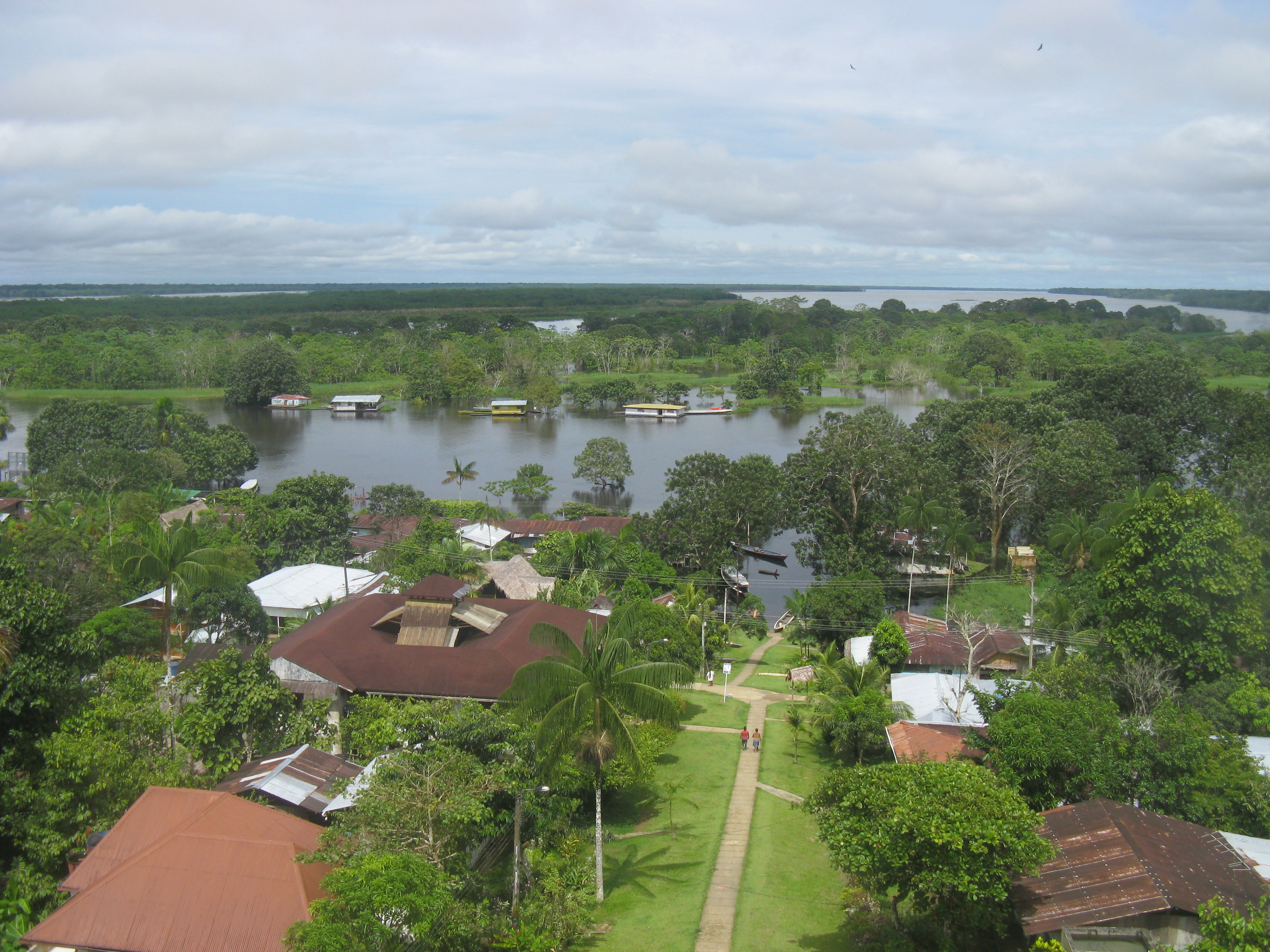
View of Puerto Nariño and the Amazon from the viewing platform in the village

Puerto Nariño is the second municipality of the Amazonas department, located on the edge of the River Loretoyaco, 67 km (42 mi) from Leticia and 1,240 km (770 mi) from Bogotá. The average temperature is 30 °C (86 °F).

== Climate ==
Puerto Nariño has a tropical rainforest climate (Köppen Af) with heavy to very heavy rainfall year-round.

Climate data for Puerto Nariño
Month	Jan	Feb	Mar	Apr	May	Jun	Jul	Aug	Sep	Oct	Nov	Dec	Year
Mean daily maximum °C (°F)	30.7 (87.3)	30.8 (87.4)	30.7 (87.3)	30.5 (86.9)	30.1 (86.2)	29.7 (85.5)	29.9 (85.8)	30.7 (87.3)	31.0 (87.8)	31.2 (88.2)	31.2 (88.2)	31.0 (87.8)	30.6 (87.1)
Daily mean °C (°F)	26.1 (79.0)	26.1 (79.0)	26.2 (79.2)	25.9 (78.6)	25.7 (78.3)	25.3 (77.5)	25.1 (77.2)	25.7 (78.3)	25.9 (78.6)	26.3 (79.3)	26.4 (79.5)	26.2 (79.2)	25.9 (78.6)
Mean daily minimum °C (°F)	21.5 (70.7)	21.5 (70.7)	21.7 (71.1)	21.4 (70.5)	21.4 (70.5)	20.9 (69.6)	20.3 (68.5)	20.8 (69.4)	20.9 (69.6)	21.5 (70.7)	21.7 (71.1)	21.5 (70.7)	21.3 (70.3)
Average rainfall mm (inches)	349.7 (13.77)	304.0 (11.97)	300.9 (11.85)	323.8 (12.75)	290.7 (11.44)	250.6 (9.87)	151.8 (5.98)	138.3 (5.44)	193.2 (7.61)	203.1 (8.00)	193.2 (7.61)	349.2 (13.75)	3,048.5 (120.04)
Average rainy days (≥ 1 mm)	19	17	15	16	17	15	10	9	12	13	12	19	174
Source 1: IDEAM
Source 2: Climate-Data.org
