= Norwegian Medical Products Agency =

The Norwegian Medical Products Agency formerly the Norwegian Medicines Agency (Norwegian: Direktoratet for Medisinske Produkter; previously Statens legemiddelverk, Legemiddelverket) is the national regulatory authority in Norway for new and existing pharmaceuticals, medical devices and for the security of their supply chain. The agency is responsible for supervising the production, clinical trials and marketing of medicines. It approves medicines and monitors their use, and ensures cost-efficient, effective and well-documented use of medicines. The agency also supervises the supply chain and regulates pharmacy prices and trade conditions.
