= Mirití-Paraná =

- Municipality and town
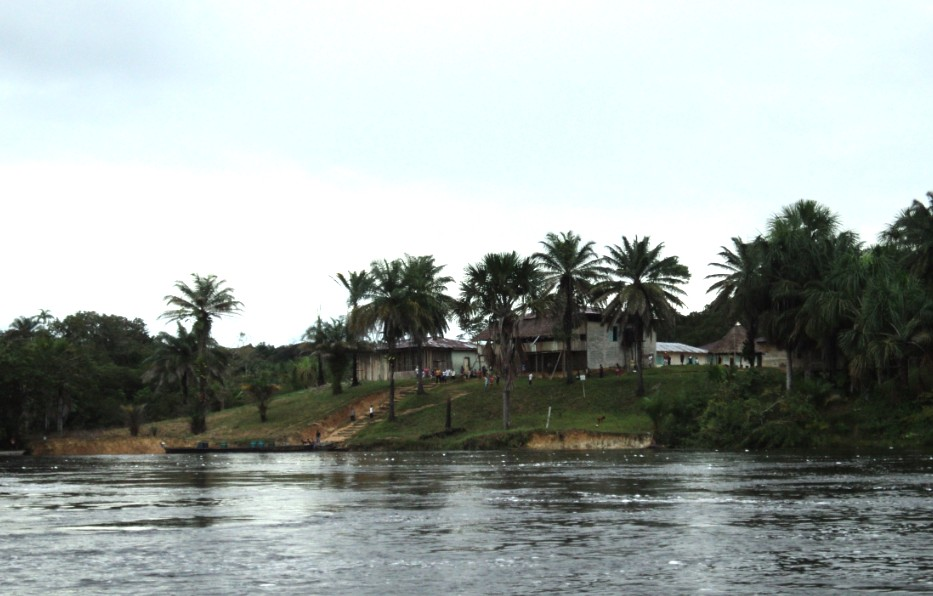

- Location of the municipality and town of Mirití-Paraná in the Amazonas Department of Colombia

- Location in Colombia
- Coordinates: 0°53′0″S 70°59′1″W
- Country: Colombia
- Department: Amazonas Department
- Time zone: UTC-5 (Colombia Standard Time)

Mirití-Paraná is a town and municipality in the southern Colombian Department of Amazonas.
