= Amazonas Department, Colombia =

Department of Colombia

Coordinates: 1°30′S 71°30′W

Department of Amazonas Departamento del Amazonas
- Department
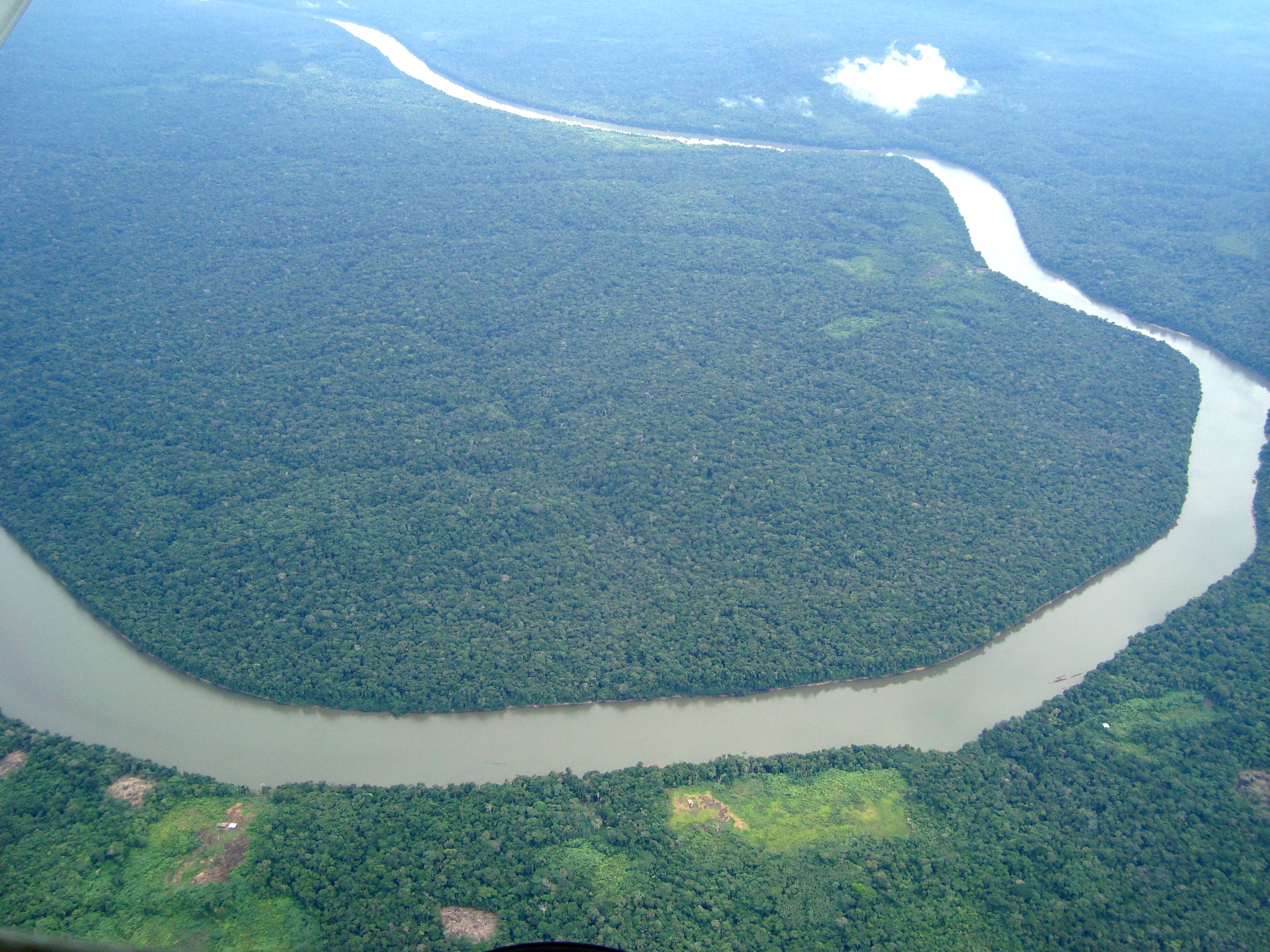
- Amazonas River in Colombia

- Flag Coat of arms
- Motto: Entre todos podemos (Spanish: All together we can)
- Anthem: Himno de Amazonas
- Amazonas shown in red

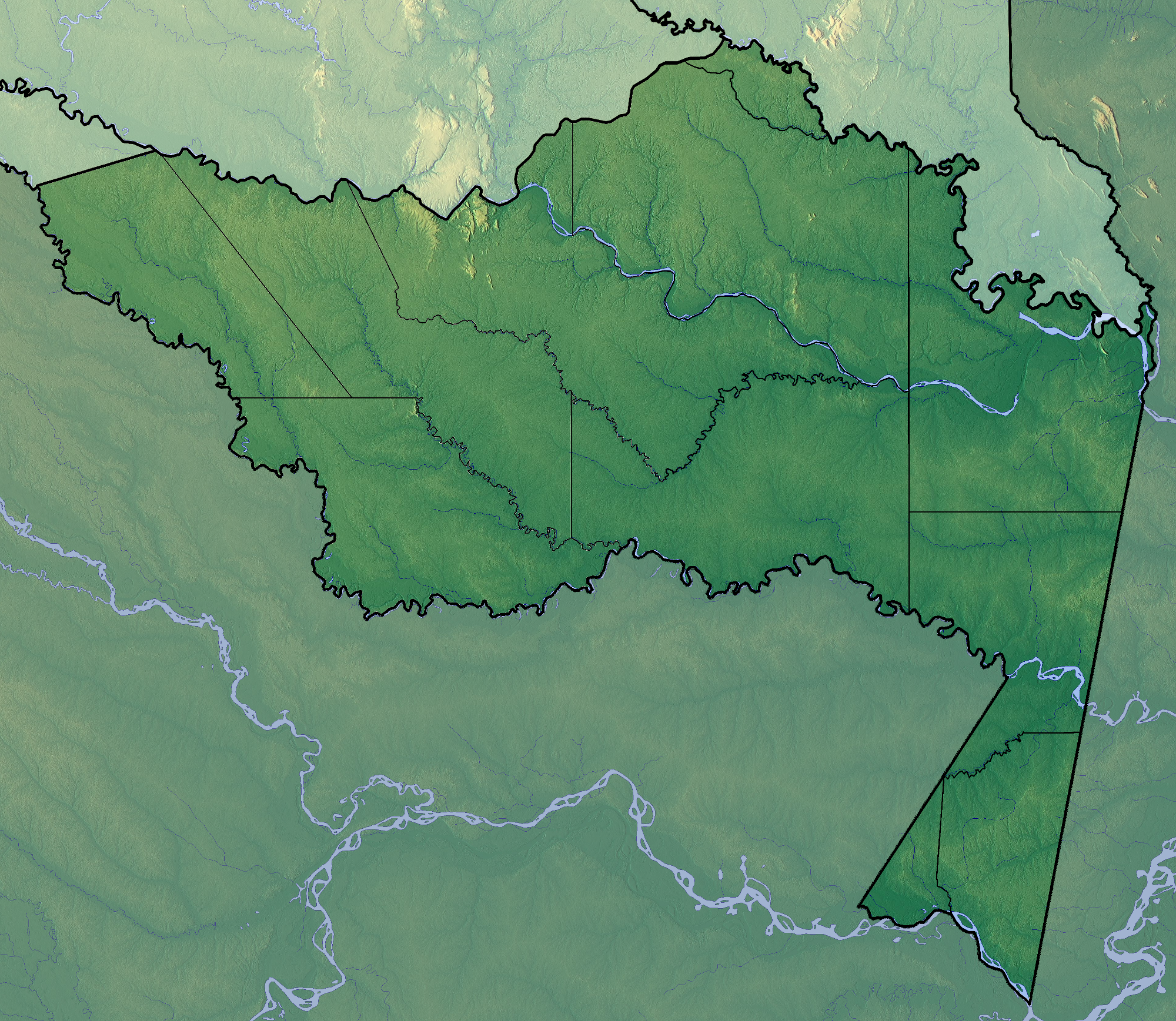
- Topography of the department
- Country: Colombia
- Region: Amazonía Region
- Department: 1991
- Intendancy: 1931
- Capital: Leticia

Government
  - Governor: Óscar Sánchez Guerrero (2024-present)

Area
  - Total: 109,665 km^{2} (42,342 sq mi)
  - Rank: 1st

Population (2018)
  - Total: 76,589
  - Rank: 30th
  - Density: 0.69839/km^{2} (1.8088/sq mi)

GDP
  - Total: COP 1,068 billion (US$ 0.3 billion)
- Time zone: UTC-05
- ISO 3166 code: CO-AMA
- HDI: 0.740 high · 25th of 33
- Website: www.amazonas.gov.co

Amazonas (Spanish pronunciation: [amaˈsonas]) is a department of Southern Colombia. It is the largest department in area while having the third smallest population among the departments. Its capital is Leticia and its name comes from the Amazon River, which drains the department.

It is made up entirely of Amazon Rainforest territory. The southern portion of the department, south of the Putumayo River, is called the "Amazonian Trapeze", which includes the triple border of Colombia, Peru and Brazil, and its southern limit is the Amazon River.

== Toponymy ==
The department name comes from the name of the Amazon River. The river was named by the Spanish explorer Francisco de Orellana (1511–1546), who, on his voyage of exploration, said he was attacked by "fierce females" who looked like Amazons of the Greek mythology; however, the existence of a female warrior tribe in that time hasn't been demonstrated and it is possible that they were long-haired Native American warriors who impressed the conqueror, who called the jungle and the river with the name of Amazon.

== Demographics ==
The following ethnic groups are found in the department: Bora, Cocama, Macuna, Mirana, Okaina, Ticunas, Tucano, Uitoto, Yagua, and Yucuna, among others. These groups are more than 5,000 years old. In 2018, the population comprised 76,589 people.

Historical population
Year	Pop.	±%
1938	6,414	—
1951	7,619	+18.8%
1964	12,962	+70.1%
1973	15,677	+20.9%
1985	39,937	+154.7%
1993	56,399	+41.2%
2005	67,726	+20.1%
2018	76,589	+13.1%

== National parks ==
The Amazonas Department covers 109,665 km^{2} (42,342 mi^{2}) of protected area, most of it under the name of "forest reserve" since 1959. There are currently four "National Parks" (Amacayacú, Cahuinarí, Rio Puree, and Yagoje Apaporis).

== Municipalities and communities ==
1. El Encanto
2. La Chorrera
3. La Pedrera
4. La Victoria
5. Leticia
6. Mirití-Paraná
7. Puerto Alegría
8. Puerto Arica
9. Puerto Nariño
10. Puerto Santander
11. Tarapacá

Municipalities of Amazonas

== See also ==
- Amazonas State, Venezuela
- Amazonas State, Brazil
