= COVID-19 pandemic by country and territory =

COVID-19 pandemic
- Confirmed deaths per 100,000 population, (Note: Our World in Data (OWID). See Coronavirus Source Data for OWID sourcing info. Excerpt: "Deaths and cases: our data source. Our World in Data relies on data from Johns Hopkins University. ... JHU updates its data multiple times each day. This data is sourced from governments, national and subnational agencies across the world — a full list of data sources for each country is published on Johns Hopkins GitHub site. It also makes its data publicly available there.") as of 20 December 2023: 555+; 100–555; 18–100; 3.3–18; 0.6–3.3; 0.1–0.6; <0.1; No deaths or no data
- Disease: COVID-19
- Pathogen: SARS-CoV-2
- Source: Probably bats, possibly via pangolins
- Location: Worldwide
- First outbreak: China
- Index case: Wuhan, Hubei, China; 30°37′11″N 114°15′28″E
- Date: First case of COVID-19: 17 November 2019; 6 years ago Public health emergency of international concern: 30 January 2020 – 5 May 2023 (3 years, 3 months and 5 days)
- Confirmed cases: 779,277,425
- Deaths: 7,115,706
- Vaccinations: 5,645,247,500 (total vaccinated); 5,197,972,500 (fully vaccinated); 13,724,514,000 (doses administered)

This is a general overview and status of places affected by severe acute respiratory syndrome coronavirus 2 (SARS-CoV-2), the virus which causes coronavirus disease 2019 (COVID-19) and is responsible for the COVID-19 pandemic. The first human cases of COVID-19 were identified in Wuhan, the capital of the province of Hubei in China in December 2019. It spread to other areas of Asia, and then worldwide in early 2020.

The figures presented are based on reported cases and deaths. While in several high-income countries the ratio of total estimated cases and deaths to reported cases and deaths is low and close to 1, for some countries it may be more than 10 or even more than 100. Implementation of COVID-19 surveillance methods varies widely.

== Maps and timelines ==
=== Total cases ===
World maps showing total confirmed cases, and total confirmed cases per million, by country. Data is from the COVID-19 Data Repository by the Center for Systems Science and Engineering (CSSE) at Johns Hopkins University. (Note: "CSSEGISandData/COVID-19". GitHub. 16 October 2022. COVID-19 Data Repository by the Center for Systems Science and Engineering (CSSE) at Johns Hopkins University. The CSV files are downloaded via the "Raw" links. The "Raw" link doesn't show up until you click the csv file link. This opens into a GitHub page with the data and the "Raw" link. See How to Use our Data for more info and links. See: Pandemic Data Initiative. See more sourcing history and info.)

Map of total confirmed cases by country (Note: Our World in Data (OWID) maps and graphs on cases and deaths. Click on the download tab to download the image. The table tab has a table of the exact data by country. The source tab reports the data is from the COVID-19 Data Repository by the Center for Systems Science and Engineering (CSSE) at Johns Hopkins University. The image at the source is interactive and provides more detail. For example, for maps move the cursor over the color bar legend to see the countries that apply to that point in the legend. For graphs, put cursor over the graph for more info. See Coronavirus Source Data for more OWID sourcing info.)

Date of latest upload at the Commons source

Map of confirmed cases per million by country

Date of latest upload at the Commons source

=== Total deaths ===
Data is from the COVID-19 Data Repository by the Center for Systems Science and Engineering (CSSE) at Johns Hopkins University.

Map of total confirmed deaths by country

Date on map.

Map of total confirmed deaths per million people by country

Date on map.

=== Daily deaths ===
Data for the map and graphs is from the COVID-19 Data Repository by the Center for Systems Science and Engineering (CSSE) at Johns Hopkins University. 7-day rolling average.

Map of daily new confirmed deaths per million people by country

Date on map.

Graph of daily new confirmed deaths worldwide per million people

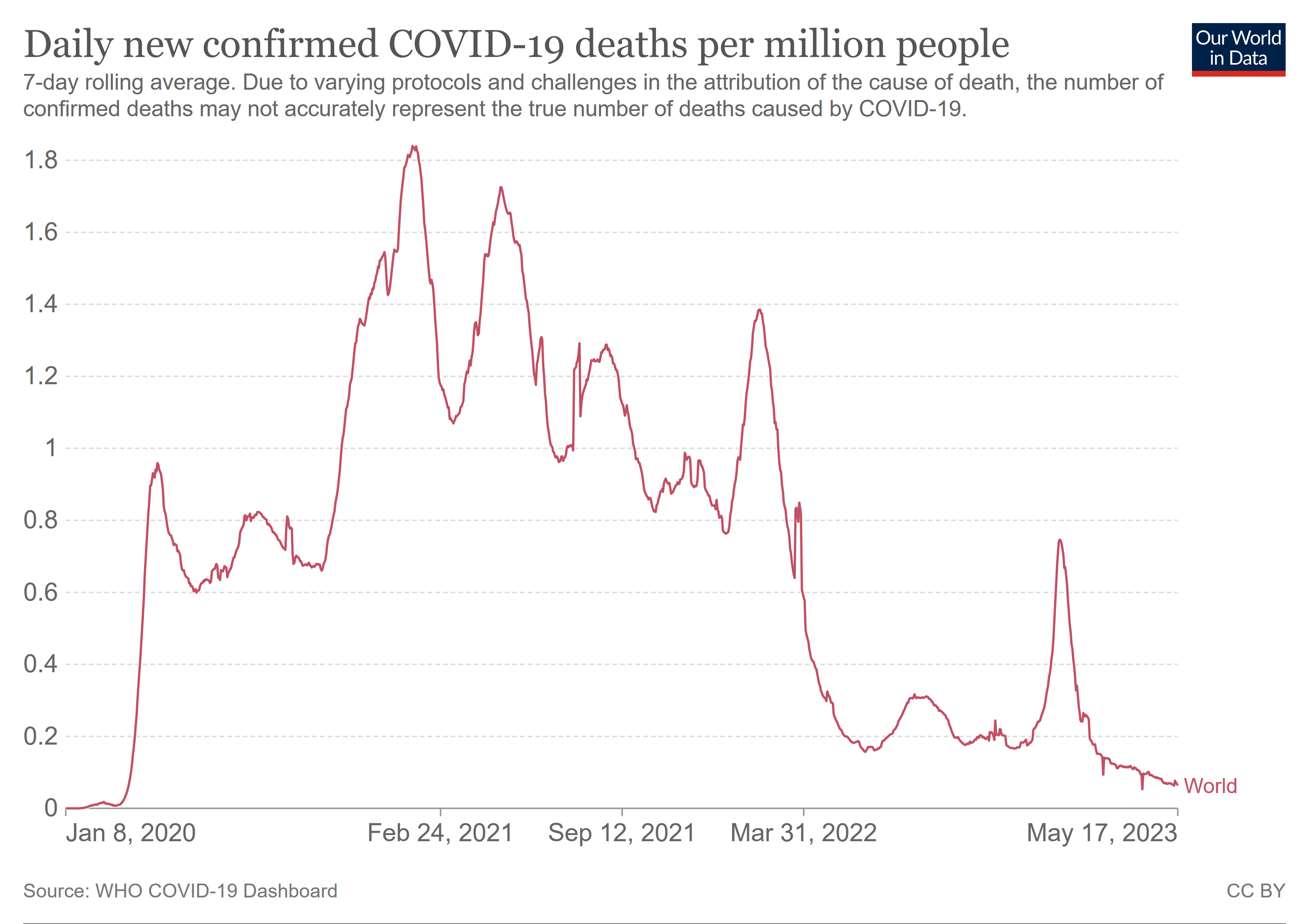

Date on timeline at bottom

Graph showing daily count of new confirmed deaths worldwide

Date on timeline at bottom

=== Weekly deaths ===
Data for the graph is from the COVID-19 Data Repository by the Center for Systems Science and Engineering (CSSE) at Johns Hopkins University.

Graph of weekly count of new confirmed deaths worldwide

Date on timeline at bottom

=== Total vaccinations ===
Data is collated by Our World in Data from figures that are verifiable based on public official sources. (Note: Our World in Data (OWID) vaccination maps. Click on the download tab to download the map. The table tab has a table of the exact data by country. The source tab reports that the data is from verifiable public official sources collated by Our World in Data. The map at the source is interactive and provides more detail. Run the cursor over the color bar legend to see the countries that apply to that point in the legend. There is an OWID vaccination info FAQ.)

Share of fully vaccinated population by country relative to population

Date on map

Share of population with at least one dose of vaccine by country relative to population
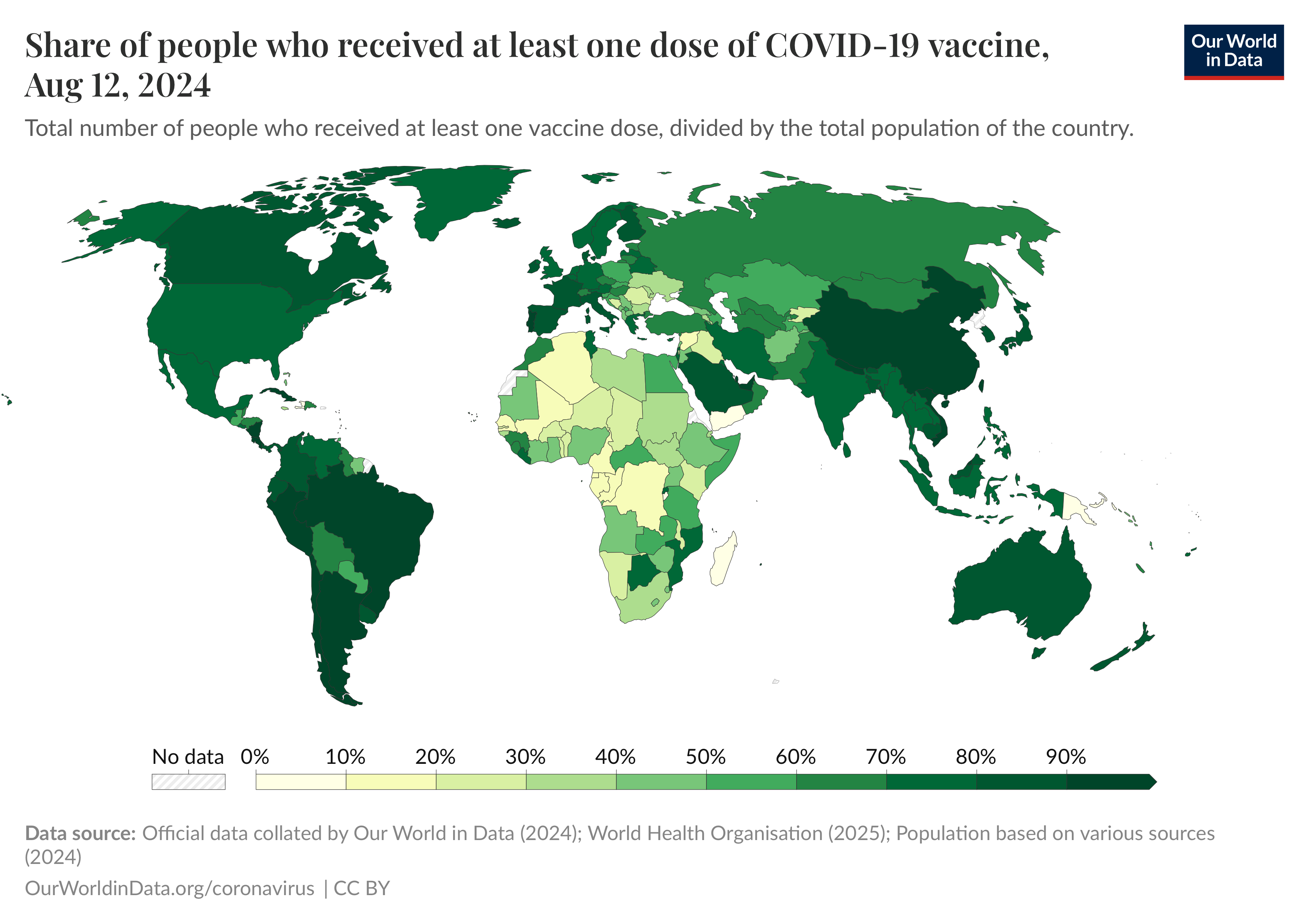
Date on map

Vaccine doses administered per 100 people by country

Date on map

== Statistics ==
=== Total cases, deaths, and death rates by country ===
The table was updated automatically on 18 September 2026. (Note: The table data is automatically updated by a bot; see Template:COVID-19 data for more information. See also: Category:Automatically updated COVID-19 pandemic table templates.) Data source is Our World in Data.

All columns are cumulative. "Deaths per million" is the number of deaths per million people.

Updated September 18, 2026.

COVID-19 cases, deaths, and rates by location
| | Country | Deaths / million | Deaths | Cases |
|---|---|---|---|---|
| | World (Note: Countries which do not report data for a column are not included in that column's world total.) | 894 | 7,115,706 | 779,277,425 |
| (Peru) | Peru | 6,604 | 221,072 | 4,533,862 |
| (Bulgaria) | Bulgaria | 5,681 | 38,778 | 1,341,082 |
| (North Macedonia) | North Macedonia | 5,429 | 9,991 | 352,093 |
| (Bosnia and Herzegovina) | Bosnia and Herzegovina | 5,123 | 16,419 | 404,289 |
| (Hungary) | Hungary | 5,072 | 49,124 | 2,240,901 |
| (Croatia) | Croatia | 4,813 | 18,806 | 1,371,705 |
| (Slovenia) | Slovenia | 4,686 | 9,914 | 1,366,935 |
| (Georgia (country)) | Georgia | 4,519 | 17,151 | 1,864,337 |
| (Montenegro) | Montenegro | 4,317 | 2,654 | 251,280 |
| (Czech Republic) | Czech Republic | 4,122 | 43,995 | 4,887,686 |
| (Latvia) | Latvia | 4,115 | 7,741 | 977,804 |
| (Moldova) | Moldova | 4,042 | 12,290 | 656,467 |
| (Slovakia) | Slovakia | 3,910 | 21,401 | 1,889,970 |
| (Greece) | Greece | 3,865 | 40,254 | 5,868,533 |
| (San Marino) | San Marino | 3,693 | 126 | 25,292 |
| (United States) | United States | 3,627 | 1,239,049 | 103,436,829 |
| (Romania) | Romania | 3,604 | 69,096 | 3,604,142 |
| (Lithuania) | Lithuania | 3,525 | 9,931 | 1,448,719 |
| (United Kingdom) | United Kingdom | 3,404 | 232,112 | 25,122,084 |
| (Brazil) | Brazil | 3,347 | 704,066 | 38,050,567 |
| (Italy) | Italy | 3,329 | 198,523 | 26,969,918 |
| (Chile) | Chile | 3,298 | 64,497 | 5,410,536 |
| (Martinique) | Martinique | 3,159 | 1,104 | 230,354 |
| (Poland) | Poland | 3,157 | 121,221 | 6,843,989 |
| (Armenia) | Armenia | 3,049 | 8,785 | 454,904 |
| (Gibraltar) | Gibraltar | 3,002 | 113 | 20,550 |
| (Belgium) | Belgium | 2,949 | 34,339 | 4,908,511 |
| (Paraguay) | Paraguay | 2,940 | 19,880 | 735,759 |
| (Trinidad and Tobago) | Trinidad and Tobago | 2,934 | 4,390 | 191,496 |
| (Argentina) | Argentina | 2,881 | 130,859 | 10,119,840 |
| (Portugal) | Portugal | 2,847 | 29,663 | 5,671,925 |
| (European Union) | European Union (Note: Data on member states of the European Union are individually listed, but are also summed here for convenience. They are not double-counted in world totals.) | 2,832 | 1,271,086 | 186,989,386 |
| (Sweden) | Sweden | 2,813 | 29,509 | 2,787,610 |
| (Russia) | Russia | 2,777 | 404,290 | 24,901,467 |
| (Colombia) | Colombia | 2,760 | 142,824 | 6,405,305 |
| (Aruba) | Aruba | 2,708 | 292 | 44,224 |
| (Ukraine) | Ukraine | 2,678 | 109,937 | 5,555,544 |
| (Serbia) | Serbia | 2,658 | 18,057 | 2,568,005 |
| (Guadeloupe) | Guadeloupe | 2,654 | 1,021 | 203,235 |
| (France) | France | 2,616 | 168,207 | 39,061,500 |
| (Mexico) | Mexico | 2,605 | 335,153 | 7,632,101 |
| (Estonia) | Estonia | 2,549 | 3,442 | 619,786 |
| (Spain) | Spain | 2,548 | 121,886 | 13,980,340 |
| (Bermuda) | Bermuda | 2,547 | 165 | 18,860 |
| (Guam) | Guam | 2,536 | 419 | 52,287 |
| (Austria) | Austria | 2,485 | 22,534 | 6,083,796 |
| (Tunisia) | Tunisia | 2,427 | 29,423 | 1,153,361 |
| (French Polynesia) | French Polynesia | 2,318 | 650 | 79,451 |
| (Saint Lucia) | Saint Lucia | 2,293 | 410 | 30,254 |
| (Uruguay) | Uruguay | 2,269 | 7,697 | 1,043,295 |
| (Liechtenstein) | Liechtenstein | 2,262 | 89 | 21,649 |
| (Suriname) | Suriname | 2,256 | 1,406 | 82,542 |
| (Sint Maarten) | Sint Maarten | 2,182 | 92 | 11,051 |
| (Malta) | Malta | 2,139 | 1,130 | 125,608 |
| (The Bahamas) | Bahamas | 2,135 | 849 | 39,127 |
| (Barbados) | Barbados | 2,100 | 593 | 109,275 |
| (Germany) | Germany | 2,080 | 174,979 | 38,437,953 |
| (Finland) | Finland | 2,058 | 11,466 | 1,518,795 |
| (Grenada) | Grenada | 2,035 | 238 | 19,693 |
| (Ecuador) | Ecuador | 2,023 | 36,064 | 1,082,356 |
| (Panama) | Panama | 2,009 | 8,843 | 1,045,788 |
| (Andorra) | Andorra | 1,994 | 159 | 48,015 |
| (Republic of Ireland) | Republic of Ireland | 1,914 | 9,785 | 1,749,995 |
| (Lebanon) | Lebanon | 1,905 | 10,947 | 1,239,904 |
| (Kosovo) | Kosovo | 1,869 | 3,212 | 274,279 |
| (Bolivia) | Bolivia | 1,853 | 22,389 | 1,212,187 |
| (Costa Rica) | Costa Rica | 1,848 | 9,396 | 1,242,945 |
| (Puerto Rico) | Puerto Rico | 1,832 | 5,938 | 1,252,713 |
| (Hong Kong) | Hong Kong | 1,798 | 13,466 | 2,876,106 |
| (Montserrat) | Montserrat | 1,787 | 8 | 1,403 |
| (Monaco) | Monaco | 1,720 | 67 | 17,181 |
| (Belize) | Belize | 1,708 | 688 | 71,511 |
| (Denmark) | Denmark | 1,696 | 10,012 | 3,453,827 |
| (British Virgin Islands) | British Virgin Islands | 1,669 | 64 | 7,661 |
| (Curaçao) | Curaçao | 1,645 | 305 | 45,883 |
| (South Africa) | South Africa | 1,644 | 102,595 | 4,073,188 |
| (Iran) | Iran | 1,640 | 146,837 | 7,627,863 |
| (Switzerland) | Switzerland | 1,611 | 14,170 | 4,492,191 |
| (Guyana) | Guyana | 1,596 | 1,312 | 75,858 |
| (Collectivity of Saint Martin) | Collectivity of Saint Martin | 1,591 | 46 | 12,324 |
| (Antigua and Barbuda) | Antigua and Barbuda | 1,572 | 146 | 9,106 |
| (Jersey) | Jersey | 1,555 | 161 | 66,391 |
| (Luxembourg) | Luxembourg | 1,530 | 1,000 | 401,725 |
| (United States Virgin Islands) | United States Virgin Islands | 1,525 | 132 | 25,389 |
| (Cyprus) | Cyprus | 1,450 | 1,364 | 718,987 |
| (Caribbean Netherlands) | Caribbean Netherlands | 1,430 | 41 | 11,922 |
| (Canada) | Canada | 1,424 | 55,282 | 4,819,055 |
| (Namibia) | Namibia | 1,422 | 4,110 | 172,557 |
| (Israel) | Israel | 1,395 | 12,707 | 4,841,703 |
| (French Guiana) | French Guiana | 1,384 | 413 | 98,041 |
| (Isle of Man) | Isle of Man | 1,378 | 116 | 38,008 |
| (Seychelles) | Seychelles | 1,370 | 172 | 51,899 |
| (Netherlands) | Netherlands | 1,283 | 22,986 | 8,657,644 |
| (Jamaica) | Jamaica | 1,279 | 3,634 | 157,694 |
| (Albania) | Albania | 1,275 | 3,608 | 337,234 |
| (Jordan) | Jordan | 1,254 | 14,122 | 1,746,997 |
| (Saint Vincent and the Grenadines) | Saint Vincent and the Grenadines | 1,214 | 124 | 9,674 |
| (Eswatini) | Eswatini | 1,170 | 1,427 | 75,356 |
| (Turkey) | Turkey | 1,164 | 101,419 | 17,004,726 |
| (Botswana) | Botswana | 1,148 | 2,801 | 330,699 |
| (Guatemala) | Guatemala | 1,132 | 20,209 | 1,256,348 |
| (Dominica) | Dominica | 1,107 | 74 | 16,047 |
| (New Caledonia) | New Caledonia | 1,093 | 314 | 80,203 |
| (Malaysia) | Malaysia | 1,076 | 37,351 | 5,329,836 |
| (Palestine) | Palestine | 1,075 | 5,708 | 703,228 |
| (Honduras) | Honduras | 1,062 | 11,114 | 473,131 |
| (Réunion) | Réunion | 1,056 | 921 | 494,595 |
| (Guernsey) | Guernsey | 1,050 | 67 | 35,326 |
| (Norway) | Norway | 1,050 | 5,732 | 1,552,735 |
| (Azerbaijan) | Azerbaijan | 1,005 | 10,353 | 836,510 |
| (Bahrain) | Bahrain | 1,001 | 1,536 | 696,614 |
| (Saint Kitts and Nevis) | Saint Kitts and Nevis | 984 | 46 | 6,607 |
| (Oman) | Oman | 978 | 4,628 | 399,449 |
| (Australia) | Australia | 963 | 25,236 | 11,861,161 |
| (Fiji) | Fiji | 962 | 885 | 69,047 |
| (Kazakhstan) | Kazakhstan | 951 | 19,072 | 1,504,370 |
| (Turks and Caicos Islands) | Turks and Caicos Islands | 893 | 41 | 6,937 |
| (Libya) | Libya | 891 | 6,437 | 507,269 |
| (Northern Mariana Islands) | Northern Mariana Islands | 889 | 41 | 14,985 |
| (New Zealand) | New Zealand | 884 | 4,538 | 2,668,236 |
| (Anguilla) | Anguilla | 844 | 12 | 3,904 |
| (Mauritius) | Mauritius | 841 | 1,074 | 332,300 |
| (Cape Verde) | Cabo Verde | 802 | 417 | 64,550 |
| (Wallis and Futuna) | Wallis and Futuna | 782 | 9 | 3,760 |
| (Belarus) | Belarus | 775 | 7,118 | 994,102 |
| (Cuba) | Cuba | 771 | 8,530 | 1,113,838 |
| (Sri Lanka) | Sri Lanka | 740 | 16,907 | 672,812 |
| (Taiwan) | Taiwan | 739 | 17,672 | 9,970,937 |
| (American Samoa) | American Samoa | 702 | 34 | 8,359 |
| (South Korea) | South Korea | 693 | 35,934 | 34,571,873 |
| (El Salvador) | El Salvador | 673 | 4,230 | 202,146 |
| (Mongolia) | Mongolia | 630 | 2,136 | 1,011,489 |
| (Mayotte) | Mayotte | 612 | 187 | 42,027 |
| (Maldives) | Maldives | 602 | 316 | 186,694 |
| (Japan) | Japan | 597 | 74,694 | 33,803,572 |
| (Philippines) | Philippines | 586 | 66,864 | 4,173,631 |
| (Indonesia) | Indonesia | 581 | 162,059 | 6,830,274 |
| (Federated States of Micronesia) | Federated States of Micronesia | 579 | 65 | 31,765 |
| (Iraq) | Iraq | 575 | 25,375 | 2,465,545 |
| (Palau) | Palau | 562 | 10 | 6,372 |
| (Kuwait) | Kuwait | 559 | 2,570 | 667,290 |
| (Faroe Islands) | Faroe Islands | 518 | 28 | 34,658 |
| (Cayman Islands) | Cayman Islands | 516 | 37 | 31,472 |
| (Iceland) | Iceland | 489 | 186 | 211,318 |
| (Thailand) | Thailand | 488 | 35,015 | 5,527,815 |
| (Saint Barthélemy) | Saint Barthélemy | 456 | 5 | 5,507 |
| (Morocco) | Morocco | 436 | 16,305 | 1,279,115 |
| (Vietnam) | Vietnam | 433 | 43,206 | 11,624,000 |
| (Marshall Islands) | Marshall Islands | 424 | 17 | 16,297 |
| (Nepal) | Nepal | 404 | 12,034 | 1,003,968 |
| (Brunei) | Brunei | 399 | 182 | 350,550 |
| (Dominican Republic) | Dominican Republic | 390 | 4,384 | 661,103 |
| (Greenland) | Greenland | 374 | 21 | 11,971 |
| (India) | India | 374 | 533,849 | 45,056,221 |
| (Myanmar) | Myanmar | 362 | 19,494 | 643,401 |
| (Singapore) | Singapore | 358 | 2,024 | 3,006,155 |
| (Zimbabwe) | Zimbabwe | 357 | 5,740 | 266,436 |
| (São Tomé and Príncipe) | Sao Tome and Principe | 353 | 80 | 6,771 |
| (Saint Pierre and Miquelon) | Saint Pierre and Miquelon | 347 | 2 | 3,426 |
| (Lesotho) | Lesotho | 310 | 709 | 36,140 |
| (Saudi Arabia) | Saudi Arabia | 299 | 9,646 | 841,469 |
| (Solomon Islands) | Solomon Islands | 254 | 199 | 25,954 |
| (Qatar) | Qatar | 238 | 690 | 514,524 |
| (United Arab Emirates) | United Arab Emirates | 229 | 2,349 | 1,067,030 |
| (Egypt) | Egypt | 220 | 24,830 | 516,023 |
| (Venezuela) | Venezuela | 207 | 5,856 | 552,790 |
| (Mauritania) | Mauritania | 204 | 997 | 63,891 |
| (Zambia) | Zambia | 202 | 4,078 | 349,892 |
| (Afghanistan) | Afghanistan | 197 | 7,998 | 235,214 |
| (Comoros) | Comoros | 193 | 161 | 9,109 |
| (Kiribati) | Kiribati | 183 | 24 | 5,085 |
| (Cambodia) | Cambodia | 177 | 3,056 | 139,326 |
| (Bangladesh) | Bangladesh | 174 | 29,531 | 2,052,280 |
| (Macau) | Macau | 174 | 121 | 3,514 |
| (Djibouti) | Djibouti | 166 | 189 | 15,690 |
| (Algeria) | Algeria | 151 | 6,881 | 272,440 |
| (Kyrgyzstan) | Kyrgyzstan | 147 | 1,024 | 88,953 |
| (Samoa) | Samoa | 144 | 31 | 17,057 |
| (The Gambia) | Gambia | 141 | 372 | 12,627 |
| (Syria) | Syria | 140 | 3,163 | 57,423 |
| (Cook Islands) | Cook Islands | 135 | 2 | 7,375 |
| (Malawi) | Malawi | 130 | 2,686 | 89,168 |
| (Gabon) | Gabon | 126 | 307 | 49,069 |
| (Pakistan) | Pakistan | 125 | 30,656 | 1,580,631 |
| (Tonga) | Tonga | 123 | 13 | 16,992 |
| (Senegal) | Senegal | 111 | 1,972 | 89,440 |
| (Rwanda) | Rwanda | 107 | 1,468 | 133,274 |
| (Kenya) | Kenya | 104 | 5,689 | 344,162 |
| (Sudan) | Sudan | 102 | 5,046 | 63,993 |
| (Equatorial Guinea) | Equatorial Guinea | 101 | 183 | 17,130 |
| (Timor-Leste) | Timor-Leste | 100 | 138 | 23,460 |
| (Tuvalu) | Tuvalu | 99 | 1 | 2,943 |
| (Laos) | Laos | 88 | 671 | 219,060 |
| (China) | China (Note: Does not include special administrative regions (Hong Kong and Macau) or Taiwan.) | 85 | 122,398 | 99,381,761 |
| (Nauru) | Nauru | 84 | 1 | 5,393 |
| (Guinea-Bissau) | Guinea-Bissau | 84 | 177 | 9,614 |
| (Uganda) | Uganda | 76 | 3,632 | 172,234 |
| (Somalia) | Somalia | 76 | 1,361 | 27,334 |
| (Haiti) | Haiti | 74 | 860 | 35,009 |
| (Cameroon) | Cameroon | 71 | 1,974 | 125,325 |
| (Mozambique) | Mozambique | 68 | 2,252 | 233,935 |
| (Papua New Guinea) | Papua New Guinea | 65 | 670 | 46,864 |
| (Republic of the Congo) | Republic of the Congo | 64 | 389 | 25,234 |
| (Ethiopia) | Ethiopia | 60 | 7,574 | 501,339 |
| (Yemen) | Yemen | 56 | 2,159 | 11,945 |
| (Liberia) | Liberia | 54 | 294 | 8,090 |
| (Angola) | Angola | 54 | 1,937 | 107,487 |
| (Madagascar) | Madagascar | 46 | 1,428 | 68,853 |
| (Vanuatu) | Vanuatu | 44 | 14 | 12,019 |
| (Ghana) | Ghana | 44 | 1,463 | 172,843 |
| (Nicaragua) | Nicaragua | 36 | 245 | 17,238 |
| (Togo) | Togo | 35 | 290 | 39,564 |
| (Guinea) | Guinea | 33 | 468 | 38,594 |
| (Mali) | Mali | 32 | 743 | 33,236 |
| (Eritrea) | Eritrea | 30 | 103 | 10,189 |
| (Uzbekistan) | Uzbekistan | 29 | 1,016 | 175,158 |
| (Ivory Coast) | Ivory Coast | 27 | 835 | 88,434 |
| (Bhutan) | Bhutan | 26 | 21 | 63,027 |
| (Central African Republic) | Central African Republic | 22 | 113 | 15,493 |
| (Burkina Faso) | Burkina Faso | 17 | 400 | 22,231 |
| (Sierra Leone) | Sierra Leone | 15 | 126 | 7,985 |
| (Democratic Republic of the Congo) | Democratic Republic of the Congo | 14 | 1,474 | 101,010 |
| (Nigeria) | Nigeria | 14 | 3,155 | 267,237 |
| (South Sudan) | South Sudan | 13 | 147 | 18,873 |
| (Tanzania) | Tanzania | 13 | 846 | 43,655 |
| (Niger) | Niger | 12 | 315 | 9,591 |
| (Tajikistan) | Tajikistan | 12 | 125 | 17,786 |
| (Benin) | Benin | 11 | 163 | 28,036 |
| (Chad) | Chad | 10 | 194 | 7,702 |
| (Burundi) | Burundi | 1 | 15 | 54,569 |
| (Vatican City) | Vatican City | 0 | 0 | 26 |
| (Niue) | Niue | 0 | 0 | 1,092 |
| (Falkland Islands) | Falkland Islands | 0 | 0 | 1,923 |
| (Saint Helena, Ascension and Tristan da Cunha) | Saint Helena, Ascension and Tristan da Cunha | 0 | 0 | 2,166 |
| (Pitcairn Islands) | Pitcairn Islands | 0 | 0 | 4 |
| (Tokelau) | Tokelau | 0 | 0 | 80 |
| (North Korea) | North Korea | 0 | 0 | 0 |
| (Turkmenistan) | Turkmenistan | 0 | 0 | 0 |

=== Logarithmic plot of confirmed cases from Our World in Data ===
A logarithmic plot of confirmed cases from Our World in Data using roughly the first 12 months of data from the pandemic.

Cases by country as of 18 April 2021, plotted on a logarithmic scale

=== Cumulative monthly death totals by country (World Health Organization) ===
The 2022 and 2021 tables below contain the cumulative number of monthly deaths from the pandemic of coronavirus disease 2019 (COVID-19) reported by each country and territory to the World Health Organization (WHO) and published in the WHO's spreadsheets and tables updated daily. See COVID-19 pandemic deaths for tables for all years, and for world maps and graphs.

==== 2022 ====
Sorted by March. Locations link to COVID-19 pages.

2022 monthly cumulative COVID-19 deaths
| | Location | Jan 1 | Feb 1 | Mar 1 |
|---|---|---|---|---|
| | World | 5,440,722 | 5,682,684 | 5,954,004 |
| | United States | 819,197 | 881,867 | 941,112 |
| | Brazil | 618,984 | 626,854 | 649,134 |
| | India | 481,486 | 496,242 | 514,023 |
| | Russia | 309,707 | 332,012 | 352,446 |
| | Mexico | 301,663 | 310,131 | 318,149 |
| | Peru | 202,653 | 205,505 | 210,538 |
| | United Kingdom | 149,790 | 157,677 | 161,754 |
| | Italy | 137,402 | 146,498 | 154,767 |
| | Indonesia | 144,096 | 144,348 | 148,660 |
| | Colombia | 129,901 | 134,079 | 138,693 |
| | Iran | 131,606 | 132,454 | 136,838 |
| | France | 121,149 | 128,120 | 135,262 |
| | Argentina | 117,146 | 120,988 | 126,152 |
| | Germany | 112,109 | 117,974 | 122,937 |
| | Poland | 97,559 | 105,435 | 111,586 |
| | Ukraine | 96,089 | 100,395 | 106,129 |
| | Spain | 90,556 | 95,902 | 99,875 |
| | South Africa | 91,145 | 95,093 | 99,412 |
| | Turkey | 82,361 | 87,416 | 94,445 |
| | Romania | 58,752 | 60,025 | 63,414 |
| | Philippines | 51,504 | 54,003 | 56,451 |
| | Hungary | 39,186 | 41,471 | 44,051 |
| | Chile | 39,115 | 39,721 | 42,353 |
| | Vietnam | 32,394 | 37,777 | 40,252 |
| | Czech Republic | 36,324 | 37,347 | 38,750 |
| | Canada | 30,280 | 33,722 | 36,537 |
| | Bulgaria | 30,955 | 33,318 | 35,581 |
| | Ecuador | 33,672 | 34,514 | 35,244 |
| | Malaysia | 31,487 | 31,978 | 32,749 |
| | Belgium | 28,403 | 29,161 | 30,208 |
| | Pakistan | 28,927 | 29,269 | 30,178 |
| | Bangladesh | 28,076 | 28,425 | 29,045 |
| | Tunisia | 25,569 | 26,288 | 27,784 |
| | Greece | 20,790 | 23,500 | 25,860 |
| | Iraq | 24,158 | 24,389 | 24,989 |
| | Egypt | 21,752 | 22,635 | 24,074 |
| | Japan | 18,393 | 18,792 | 23,633 |
| | Thailand | 21,708 | 22,185 | 22,976 |
| | Netherlands | 20,920 | 21,265 | 21,554 |
| | Bolivia | 19,680 | 20,919 | 21,441 |
| | Portugal | 18,955 | 19,905 | 21,063 |
| | Myanmar | 19,272 | 19,310 | 19,372 |
| | Kazakhstan | 18,231 | 18,528 | 18,947 |
| | Slovakia | 16,665 | 17,850 | 18,530 |
| | Paraguay | 16,629 | 17,260 | 18,359 |
| | Sweden | 15,377 | 16,245 | 17,416 |
| | Guatemala | 16,106 | 16,379 | 16,971 |
| | Sri Lanka | 14,995 | 15,473 | 16,244 |
| | Georgia | 13,860 | 15,016 | 16,199 |
| | Morocco | 14,849 | 15,400 | 15,988 |
| | Bosnia and Herzegovina | 13,442 | 14,447 | 15,459 |
| | Serbia | 12,714 | 13,629 | 15,241 |
| | Croatia | 12,538 | 13,827 | 15,069 |
| | Austria | 13,351 | 13,617 | 14,213 |
| | Jordan | 12,653 | 13,217 | 13,835 |
| | Switzerland | 11,921 | 12,372 | 12,683 |
| | Nepal | 11,594 | 11,752 | 11,938 |
| | Moldova | 10,275 | 10,666 | 11,228 |
| | Honduras | 10,434 | 10,504 | 10,775 |
| | Israel | 8,258 | 8,990 | 10,234 |
| | Lebanon | 9,119 | 9,606 | 10,091 |
| | Azerbaijan | 8,358 | 8,734 | 9,417 |
| | North Macedonia | 7,976 | 8,439 | 9,025 |
| | Saudi Arabia | 8,877 | 8,940 | 8,998 |
| | Cuba | 8,322 | 8,399 | 8,494 |
| | Armenia | 7,975 | 8,056 | 8,478 |
| | Lithuania | 7,404 | 7,891 | 8,431 |
| | South Korea | 5,625 | 6,772 | 8,170 |
| | Panama | 7,427 | 7,716 | 8,079 |
| | Costa Rica | 7,357 | 7,555 | 8,031 |
| Taliban | Afghanistan | 7,356 | 7,414 | 7,598 |
| | Ethiopia | 6,926 | 7,337 | 7,462 |
| | Slovenia | 6,124 | 6,457 | 7,049 |
| | Uruguay | 6,169 | 6,459 | 6,977 |
| | Algeria | 6,271 | 6,579 | 6,835 |
| | Ireland | 6,070 | 6,346 | 6,497 |
| | Belarus | 5,578 | 6,052 | 6,480 |
| | Libya | 5,710 | 6,017 | 6,261 |
| People's Republic of China | China | 5,699 | 5,700 | 6,233 |
| | Kenya | 5,376 | 5,583 | 5,639 |
| | Venezuela | 5,324 | 5,440 | 5,633 |
| | Palestine | 4,934 | 5,104 | 5,513 |
| | Zimbabwe | 4,997 | 5,338 | 5,395 |
| | Latvia | 4,570 | 4,873 | 5,224 |
| | Australia | 2,239 | 3,758 | 5,171 |
| | Denmark | 3,266 | 3,755 | 4,612 |
| | Dominican Republic | 4,247 | 4,307 | 4,368 |
| | Oman | 4,116 | 4,146 | 4,244 |
| | Puerto Rico | 3,305 | 3,855 | 4,110 |
| | El Salvador | 3,824 | 3,899 | 4,071 |
| | Namibia | 3,616 | 3,967 | 4,009 |
| | Zambia | 3,730 | 3,917 | 3,952 |
| | Sudan | 3,337 | 3,533 | 3,909 |
| | Trinidad and Tobago | 2,850 | 3,404 | 3,628 |
| | Uganda | 3,294 | 3,538 | 3,588 |
| | Albania | 3,217 | 3,346 | 3,469 |
| | Nigeria | 3,031 | 3,136 | 3,142 |
| | Kosovo | 2,980 | 3,005 | 3,104 |
| | Syria | 2,897 | 2,989 | 3,075 |
| | Cambodia | 3,012 | 3,015 | 3,032 |
| | Kyrgyzstan | 2,802 | 2,884 | 2,958 |
| | Jamaica | 2,473 | 2,658 | 2,813 |
| | Montenegro | 2,407 | 2,555 | 2,676 |
| | Botswana | 2,444 | 2,581 | 2,619 |
| | Malawi | 2,364 | 2,561 | 2,615 |
| | Kuwait | 2,468 | 2,497 | 2,538 |
| | Finland | 1,745 | 2,262 | 2,386 |
| | United Arab Emirates | 2,164 | 2,243 | 2,301 |
| | Estonia | 1,938 | 2,037 | 2,248 |
| | Mozambique | 1,976 | 2,173 | 2,192 |
| | Yemen | 1,984 | 2,012 | 2,135 |
| | Mongolia | 1,986 | 2,040 | 2,096 |
| | Senegal | 1,890 | 1,946 | 1,960 |
| | Cameroon | 1,851 | 1,880 | 1,923 |
| | Angola | 1,757 | 1,895 | 1,900 |
| | Norway | 1,305 | 1,465 | 1,659 |
| | Uzbekistan | 1,485 | 1,568 | 1,636 |
| | Rwanda | 1,350 | 1,440 | 1,457 |
| | Bahrain | 1,394 | 1,408 | 1,454 |
| | Ghana | 1,287 | 1,395 | 1,442 |
| | Eswatini | 1,303 | 1,375 | 1,390 |
| | Madagascar | 1,027 | 1,274 | 1,366 |
| | Somalia | 1,333 | 1,335 | 1,348 |
| Democratic Republic of the Congo | DR Congo | 1,205 | 1,278 | 1,335 |
| | Suriname | 1,189 | 1,261 | 1,316 |
| | Guyana | 1,052 | 1,166 | 1,220 |
| | Singapore | 828 | 855 | 1,019 |
| | Luxembourg | 916 | 952 | 991 |
| | Mauritania | 863 | 953 | 979 |
| France | Guadeloupe | 831 | 873 | 918 |
| | Mauritius | 786 | 786 | 904 |
| | Martinique | 784 | 832 | 894 |
| | Cyprus | 643 | 747 | 859 |
| | Fiji | 698 | 801 | 834 |
| | Haiti | 766 | 804 | 820 |
| | Tanzania | 737 | 778 | 798 |
| Côte d'Ivoire | Ivory Coast | 712 | 785 | 793 |
| | Bahamas | 717 | 746 | 771 |
| | Mali | 660 | 714 | 722 |
| | Lesotho | 671 | 693 | 697 |
| | Qatar | 618 | 645 | 670 |
| France | Réunion | 409 | 500 | 666 |
| | Belize | 598 | 625 | 650 |
| | French Polynesia | 636 | 636 | 641 |
| | Papua New Guinea | 590 | 597 | 638 |
| | Laos | 372 | 547 | 621 |
| | Malta | 477 | 550 | 605 |
| | Guinea | 391 | 416 | 440 |
| | Cape Verde | 352 | 396 | 401 |
| France | French Guiana | 339 | 371 | 391 |
| Republic of the Congo | Congo | 367 | 371 | 378 |
| | Burkina Faso | 318 | 366 | 375 |
| | Gambia | 343 | 364 | 365 |
| | Saint Lucia | 295 | 328 | 358 |
| | Guam | 270 | 290 | 322 |
| | Barbados | 260 | 279 | 316 |
| | Niger | 274 | 298 | 307 |
| | Gabon | 288 | 301 | 303 |
| | New Caledonia | 281 | 283 | 299 |
| | Maldives | 262 | 277 | 297 |
| | Liberia | 287 | 290 | 294 |
| | Togo | 248 | 268 | 272 |
| | Curaçao | 189 | 229 | 261 |
| | Nicaragua | 217 | 220 | 224 |
| | Grenada | 200 | 210 | 216 |
| | Aruba | 181 | 193 | 211 |
| | Chad | 181 | 190 | 190 |
| | Djibouti | 189 | 189 | 189 |
| France | Mayotte | 185 | 187 | 187 |
| | Equatorial Guinea | 175 | 182 | 182 |
| | Guinea-Bissau | 149 | 156 | 167 |
| | Benin | 161 | 163 | 163 |
| | Seychelles | 126 | 142 | 163 |
| | Comoros | 158 | 159 | 160 |
| | Andorra | 140 | 145 | 151 |
| | South Sudan | 136 | 137 | 137 |
| | Antigua and Barbuda | 119 | 127 | 135 |
| East Timor | Timor-Leste | 122 | 122 | 128 |
| | Sierra Leone | 123 | 125 | 125 |
| | Tajikistan | 125 | 125 | 125 |
| | Bermuda | 110 | 116 | 123 |
| | Central African Republic | 101 | 110 | 113 |
| | Jersey | 89 | 100 | 112 |
| | San Marino | 100 | 109 | 112 |
| United States Virgin Islands | U.S. Virgin Islands | 89 | 101 | 109 |
| | Saint Vincent and the Grenadines | 83 | 94 | 106 |
| | Eritrea | 76 | 98 | 103 |
| | Gibraltar | 100 | 101 | 101 |
| | Solomon Islands | 0 | 12 | 99 |
| | Sint Maarten | 75 | 79 | 85 |
| | Isle of Man | 67 | 71 | 80 |
| | Brunei | 57 | 59 | 76 |
| | Liechtenstein | 69 | 71 | 75 |
| | São Tomé and Príncipe | 57 | 69 | 72 |
| | British Virgin Islands | 39 | 49 | 62 |
| | Iceland | 37 | 46 | 62 |
| | Dominica | 47 | 51 | 57 |
| | New Zealand | 51 | 53 | 56 |
| | Monaco | 38 | 47 | 51 |
| France | Saint Martin | 40 | 43 | 44 |
| | Saint Kitts and Nevis | 28 | 33 | 42 |
| | Turks and Caicos Islands | 26 | 34 | 36 |
| | Guernsey | 24 | 30 | 31 |
| | Northern Mariana Islands | 13 | 23 | 30 |
| | Bonaire | 23 | 27 | 28 |
| | Faroe Islands | 14 | 18 | 28 |
| | Greenland | 1 | 6 | 18 |
| | Cayman Islands | 11 | 15 | 17 |
| | Burundi | 14 | 15 | 15 |
| | Other | 13 | 13 | 13 |
| | Kiribati | 0 | 0 | 11 |
| | Anguilla | 5 | 8 | 9 |
| France | Wallis and Futuna | 7 | 7 | 7 |
| | Bhutan | 3 | 4 | 6 |
| | Palau | 0 | 0 | 6 |
| France | Saint Barthélemy | 4 | 4 | 4 |
| | Sint Eustatius | 0 | 1 | 3 |
| | Montserrat | 1 | 1 | 2 |
| France | Saint Pierre and Miquelon | 0 | 1 | 1 |
| | American Samoa | 0 | 0 | 0 |
| | Cook Islands | 0 | 0 | 0 |
| | North Korea | 0 | 0 | 0 |
| | Falkland Islands | 0 | 0 | 0 |
| Vatican City | Holy See | 0 | 0 | 0 |
| | Marshall Islands | 0 | 0 | 0 |
| | Federated States of Micronesia | 0 | 0 | 0 |
| | Nauru | 0 | 0 | 0 |
| | Niue | 0 | 0 | 0 |
| | Pitcairn Islands | 0 | 0 | 0 |
| | Saba | 0 | 0 | 0 |
| | Saint Helena | 0 | 0 | 0 |
| | Samoa | 0 | 0 | 0 |
| | Tokelau | 0 | 0 | 0 |
| | Tonga | 0 | 0 | 0 |
| | Turkmenistan | 0 | 0 | 0 |
| | Tuvalu | 0 | 0 | 0 |
| | Vanuatu | 0 | 0 | 0 |

==== 2021. 2nd half ====
Sorted by December.

2021 (second-half) monthly cumulative COVID-19 deaths
| | Location | Jul 1 | Aug 1 | Sep 1 | Oct 1 | Nov 1 | Dec 1 |
|---|---|---|---|---|---|---|---|
| | World | 3,954,147 | 4,229,169 | 4,536,307 | 4,794,137 | 5,005,025 | 5,215,745 |
| | United States | 600,853 | 610,606 | 642,770 | 697,430 | 743,217 | 774,868 |
| | Brazil | 515,985 | 555,460 | 579,574 | 596,122 | 607,694 | 614,376 |
| | India | 399,459 | 424,351 | 439,020 | 448,339 | 458,437 | 469,247 |
| | Mexico | 238,055 | 245,959 | 267,253 | 283,091 | 290,717 | 293,950 |
| | Russia | 135,886 | 159,352 | 184,014 | 208,142 | 239,693 | 276,419 |
| | Peru | 192,331 | 196,291 | 198,263 | 199,367 | 200,217 | 201,144 |
| | United Kingdom | 128,140 | 129,654 | 132,535 | 136,662 | 140,632 | 144,969 |
| | Indonesia | 58,995 | 95,723 | 133,676 | 142,026 | 143,423 | 143,840 |
| | Italy | 127,566 | 128,063 | 129,221 | 130,921 | 132,100 | 133,828 |
| | Iran | 84,264 | 90,630 | 107,794 | 120,428 | 126,303 | 129,830 |
| | Colombia | 105,934 | 120,432 | 124,883 | 126,261 | 127,258 | 128,473 |
| | France | 110,133 | 110,795 | 112,743 | 114,447 | 115,244 | 116,655 |
| | Argentina | 93,668 | 105,586 | 111,607 | 115,179 | 115,950 | 116,554 |
| | Germany | 90,938 | 91,659 | 92,223 | 93,711 | 95,752 | 101,790 |
| | South Africa | 60,647 | 72,013 | 82,261 | 87,626 | 89,177 | 89,843 |
| | Spain | 81,744 | 82,725 | 85,574 | 87,006 | 87,568 | 88,052 |
| | Ukraine | 52,391 | 52,951 | 53,833 | 56,446 | 68,027 | 86,532 |
| | Poland | 75,058 | 75,271 | 75,368 | 75,673 | 77,019 | 84,153 |
| | Turkey | 49,732 | 51,332 | 56,710 | 64,054 | 70,611 | 76,842 |
| | Romania | 33,786 | 34,281 | 34,570 | 37,041 | 47,751 | 56,529 |
| | Philippines | 24,662 | 27,889 | 33,448 | 38,294 | 43,172 | 48,545 |
| | Chile | 32,545 | 35,448 | 36,937 | 37,468 | 37,757 | 38,346 |
| | Hungary | 29,992 | 30,026 | 30,059 | 30,199 | 30,881 | 34,713 |
| | Ecuador | 21,560 | 31,631 | 32,244 | 32,767 | 32,980 | 33,250 |
| | Czech Republic | 30,439 | 30,455 | 30,483 | 30,528 | 30,863 | 33,186 |
| | Malaysia | 5,170 | 9,024 | 16,664 | 26,335 | 28,912 | 30,425 |
| | Canada | 26,273 | 26,592 | 26,918 | 27,819 | 28,965 | 29,670 |
| | Pakistan | 22,281 | 23,360 | 25,788 | 27,729 | 28,449 | 28,728 |
| | Bulgaria | 18,061 | 18,213 | 18,896 | 20,882 | 23,999 | 28,453 |
| | Bangladesh | 14,646 | 20,916 | 26,274 | 27,531 | 27,870 | 27,981 |
| | Belgium | 25,181 | 25,251 | 25,388 | 25,613 | 26,053 | 27,015 |
| | Tunisia | 14,959 | 19,858 | 23,538 | 24,890 | 25,241 | 25,373 |
| | Vietnam | 87 | 1,306 | 11,064 | 19,301 | 22,083 | 25,252 |
| | Iraq | 17,186 | 18,657 | 20,830 | 22,260 | 23,170 | 23,820 |
| | Thailand | 2,080 | 4,990 | 11,841 | 16,850 | 19,260 | 20,814 |
| | Egypt | 16,169 | 16,524 | 16,736 | 17,331 | 18,651 | 20,474 |
| | Netherlands | 17,744 | 17,826 | 18,010 | 18,170 | 18,411 | 19,414 |
| | Bolivia | 16,702 | 17,806 | 18,429 | 18,726 | 18,925 | 19,171 |
| | Myanmar | 3,347 | 9,731 | 15,490 | 17,789 | 18,714 | 19,104 |
| | Portugal | 17,096 | 17,361 | 17,743 | 17,975 | 18,157 | 18,441 |
| | Japan | 14,781 | 15,192 | 16,041 | 17,648 | 18,268 | 18,360 |
| | Greece | 12,763 | 13,016 | 13,698 | 14,828 | 15,938 | 18,157 |
| | Kazakhstan | 7,759 | 9,077 | 13,732 | 16,055 | 17,150 | 17,856 |
| | Paraguay | 12,763 | 14,929 | 15,742 | 16,195 | 16,246 | 16,469 |
| | Guatemala | 9,215 | 10,339 | 11,926 | 13,564 | 15,050 | 15,928 |
| | Sweden | 14,660 | 14,677 | 14,724 | 14,903 | 15,058 | 15,151 |
| | Morocco | 9,296 | 9,785 | 12,649 | 14,267 | 14,668 | 14,776 |
| | Slovakia | 12,511 | 12,540 | 12,548 | 12,649 | 13,045 | 14,503 |
| | Sri Lanka | 3,063 | 4,451 | 9,400 | 12,964 | 13,760 | 14,346 |
| | Bosnia and Herzegovina | 9,647 | 9,689 | 9,803 | 10,606 | 11,555 | 12,586 |
| | Georgia | 5,327 | 5,853 | 7,482 | 8,976 | 10,089 | 12,119 |
| | Austria | 10,508 | 10,528 | 10,583 | 10,810 | 11,114 | 12,064 |
| | Serbia | 7,047 | 7,114 | 7,292 | 8,234 | 9,955 | 11,691 |
| | Jordan | 9,750 | 10,032 | 10,411 | 10,718 | 11,038 | 11,608 |
| | Nepal | 9,145 | 9,875 | 10,770 | 11,148 | 11,416 | 11,529 |
| | Switzerland | 10,366 | 10,387 | 10,489 | 10,683 | 10,834 | 11,091 |
| | Croatia | 8,206 | 8,259 | 8,334 | 8,640 | 9,220 | 10,899 |
| | Honduras | 6,980 | 7,834 | 8,850 | 9,777 | 10,240 | 10,403 |
| | Moldova | 6,194 | 6,255 | 6,401 | 6,777 | 7,790 | 9,119 |
| | Saudi Arabia | 7,819 | 8,237 | 8,545 | 8,716 | 8,794 | 8,836 |
| | Lebanon | 7,851 | 7,906 | 8,053 | 8,325 | 8,502 | 8,725 |
| | Cuba | 1,284 | 2,758 | 5,303 | 7,436 | 8,236 | 8,304 |
| | Israel | 6,430 | 6,485 | 7,118 | 7,796 | 8,114 | 8,196 |
| | Azerbaijan | 4,974 | 5,023 | 5,636 | 6,525 | 7,074 | 7,856 |
| | Armenia | 4,517 | 4,619 | 4,857 | 5,339 | 6,379 | 7,610 |
| | North Macedonia | 5,484 | 5,493 | 5,938 | 6,714 | 7,147 | 7,581 |
| | Panama | 6,536 | 6,808 | 7,054 | 7,223 | 7,315 | 7,362 |
| Taliban | Afghanistan | 4,962 | 6,737 | 7,123 | 7,206 | 7,280 | 7,308 |
| | Costa Rica | 4,661 | 5,030 | 5,492 | 6,349 | 7,047 | 7,287 |
| | Lithuania | 4,392 | 4,417 | 4,573 | 5,021 | 5,921 | 6,759 |
| | Ethiopia | 4,320 | 4,385 | 4,675 | 5,582 | 6,459 | 6,755 |
| | Uruguay | 5,558 | 5,959 | 6,029 | 6,054 | 6,077 | 6,130 |
| | Algeria | 3,716 | 4,254 | 5,269 | 5,812 | 5,920 | 6,071 |
| People's Republic of China | China | 5,495 | 5,635 | 5,683 | 5,691 | 5,696 | 5,697 |
| | Ireland | 4,998 | 5,035 | 5,092 | 5,249 | 5,436 | 5,652 |
| | Slovenia | 4,754 | 4,764 | 4,785 | 4,915 | 5,139 | 5,551 |
| | Libya | 3,193 | 3,509 | 4,247 | 4,651 | 5,099 | 5,456 |
| | Kenya | 3,634 | 3,931 | 4,726 | 5,123 | 5,281 | 5,335 |
| | Venezuela | 3,101 | 3,576 | 4,010 | 4,454 | 4,884 | 5,144 |
| | Belarus | 3,143 | 3,454 | 3,780 | 4,143 | 4,631 | 5,081 |
| | Palestine | 3,831 | 3,872 | 3,948 | 4,366 | 4,681 | 4,803 |
| | Zimbabwe | 1,789 | 3,532 | 4,419 | 4,623 | 4,678 | 4,707 |
| | Dominican Republic | 3,822 | 3,963 | 4,008 | 4,046 | 4,130 | 4,204 |
| | Latvia | 2,513 | 2,556 | 2,578 | 2,717 | 3,250 | 4,179 |
| | Oman | 3,100 | 3,836 | 4,064 | 4,096 | 4,111 | 4,113 |
| | El Salvador | 2,381 | 2,629 | 2,918 | 3,234 | 3,622 | 3,776 |
| | Zambia | 2,199 | 3,389 | 3,602 | 3,648 | 3,661 | 3,667 |
| | South Korea | 2,021 | 2,098 | 2,292 | 2,497 | 2,859 | 3,658 |
| | Namibia | 1,521 | 3,044 | 3,244 | 3,511 | 3,552 | 3,573 |
| | Puerto Rico | 2,549 | 2,580 | 2,860 | 3,149 | 3,234 | 3,270 |
| | Uganda | 1,061 | 2,696 | 3,014 | 3,161 | 3,215 | 3,252 |
| | Sudan | 2,760 | 2,780 | 2,793 | 2,878 | 3,046 | 3,159 |
| | Albania | 2,456 | 2,457 | 2,498 | 2,698 | 2,924 | 3,096 |
| | Nigeria | 2,120 | 2,149 | 2,455 | 2,721 | 2,896 | 2,977 |
| | Kosovo | 2,248 | 2,256 | 2,494 | 2,943 | 2,967 | 2,974 |
| | Cambodia | 602 | 1,397 | 1,903 | 2,319 | 2,788 | 2,940 |
| | Denmark | 2,534 | 2,549 | 2,584 | 2,656 | 2,714 | 2,895 |
| | Kyrgyzstan | 2,009 | 2,335 | 2,532 | 2,607 | 2,672 | 2,749 |
| | Syria | 1,876 | 1,914 | 2,013 | 2,247 | 2,566 | 2,749 |
| | Kuwait | 1,969 | 2,320 | 2,419 | 2,449 | 2,461 | 2,465 |
| | Botswana | 1,125 | 1,569 | 2,261 | 2,368 | 2,406 | 2,418 |
| | Jamaica | 1,075 | 1,190 | 1,518 | 1,869 | 2,236 | 2,392 |
| | Malawi | 1,196 | 1,635 | 2,177 | 2,282 | 2,301 | 2,306 |
| | Montenegro | 1,610 | 1,629 | 1,720 | 1,919 | 2,100 | 2,300 |
| | United Arab Emirates | 1,811 | 1,949 | 2,041 | 2,097 | 2,136 | 2,147 |
| | Trinidad and Tobago | 833 | 1,070 | 1,285 | 1,474 | 1,696 | 2,134 |
| | Australia | 910 | 923 | 1,006 | 1,289 | 1,734 | 2,006 |
| | Yemen | 1,361 | 1,375 | 1,472 | 1,721 | 1,889 | 1,950 |
| | Mozambique | 878 | 1,434 | 1,864 | 1,917 | 1,930 | 1,941 |
| | Mongolia | 563 | 820 | 839 | 1,222 | 1,672 | 1,932 |
| | Senegal | 1,166 | 1,353 | 1,765 | 1,858 | 1,878 | 1,885 |
| | Cameroon | 1,324 | 1,334 | 1,357 | 1,459 | 1,686 | 1,804 |
| | Estonia | 1,269 | 1,272 | 1,293 | 1,357 | 1,540 | 1,803 |
| | Angola | 900 | 1,011 | 1,217 | 1,537 | 1,710 | 1,733 |
| | Uzbekistan | 740 | 880 | 1,088 | 1,242 | 1,325 | 1,406 |
| | Bahrain | 1,352 | 1,384 | 1,388 | 1,389 | 1,393 | 1,394 |
| | Finland | 979 | 1,001 | 1,054 | 1,116 | 1,238 | 1,348 |
| | Rwanda | 427 | 808 | 1,083 | 1,273 | 1,331 | 1,342 |
| | Somalia | 775 | 811 | 977 | 1,111 | 1,208 | 1,327 |
| | Eswatini | 678 | 787 | 1,101 | 1,220 | 1,242 | 1,248 |
| | Ghana | 796 | 823 | 1,036 | 1,156 | 1,175 | 1,209 |
| | Suriname | 516 | 645 | 718 | 879 | 1,090 | 1,166 |
| Democratic Republic of the Congo | DR Congo | 924 | 1,038 | 1,059 | 1,084 | 1,098 | 1,107 |
| | Norway | 792 | 799 | 820 | 869 | 917 | 1,054 |
| | Guyana | 468 | 535 | 613 | 783 | 913 | 992 |
| | Madagascar | 909 | 947 | 956 | 960 | 963 | 967 |
| | Luxembourg | 818 | 822 | 830 | 835 | 845 | 875 |
| | Mauritania | 489 | 562 | 715 | 774 | 797 | 832 |
| France | Guadeloupe | 267 | 283 | 508 | 767 | 820 | 823 |
| | Haiti | 443 | 558 | 586 | 629 | 679 | 738 |
| | Tanzania | 21 | 21 | 50 | 719 | 725 | 730 |
| | Singapore | 36 | 37 | 55 | 95 | 407 | 718 |
| | Martinique | 98 | 129 | 460 | 628 | 683 | 715 |
| Côte d'Ivoire | Ivory Coast | 313 | 329 | 441 | 624 | 695 | 704 |
| | Fiji | 21 | 239 | 496 | 624 | 674 | 696 |
| | Bahamas | 246 | 287 | 381 | 533 | 643 | 671 |
| | Lesotho | 329 | 374 | 403 | 632 | 658 | 662 |
| | French Polynesia | 142 | 149 | 423 | 621 | 636 | 636 |
| | Qatar | 590 | 601 | 602 | 606 | 610 | 611 |
| | Mali | 525 | 532 | 539 | 548 | 563 | 606 |
| | Cyprus | 379 | 429 | 520 | 560 | 584 | 597 |
| | Belize | 329 | 337 | 359 | 409 | 491 | 574 |
| | Papua New Guinea | 174 | 192 | 192 | 234 | 370 | 546 |
| | Malta | 420 | 423 | 441 | 457 | 461 | 468 |
| | Mauritius | 18 | 20 | 31 | 90 | 176 | 422 |
| | Guinea | 171 | 220 | 335 | 379 | 385 | 387 |
| France | Réunion | 237 | 275 | 342 | 366 | 374 | 384 |
| Republic of the Congo | Congo | 166 | 178 | 183 | 197 | 278 | 354 |
| | Cape Verde | 286 | 298 | 313 | 339 | 349 | 350 |
| | Gambia | 181 | 213 | 319 | 338 | 340 | 342 |
| France | French Guiana | 145 | 187 | 219 | 267 | 308 | 327 |
| | Liberia | 128 | 148 | 245 | 286 | 287 | 287 |
| | Burkina Faso | 168 | 169 | 171 | 184 | 214 | 286 |
| | Saint Lucia | 84 | 89 | 103 | 201 | 255 | 280 |
| | Gabon | 159 | 164 | 165 | 186 | 239 | 279 |
| | New Caledonia | 0 | 0 | 0 | 119 | 265 | 276 |
| | Guam | 140 | 143 | 149 | 197 | 238 | 263 |
| | Niger | 193 | 195 | 199 | 202 | 213 | 259 |
| | Maldives | 213 | 221 | 226 | 231 | 243 | 250 |
| | Togo | 129 | 152 | 185 | 229 | 242 | 243 |
| | Barbados | 47 | 48 | 50 | 69 | 153 | 229 |
| | Nicaragua | 191 | 195 | 200 | 204 | 208 | 213 |
| | Grenada | 1 | 1 | 1 | 139 | 198 | 200 |
| | Djibouti | 155 | 156 | 157 | 167 | 181 | 186 |
| France | Mayotte | 174 | 174 | 175 | 178 | 185 | 185 |
| | Curaçao | 126 | 126 | 143 | 162 | 174 | 178 |
| | Chad | 174 | 174 | 174 | 174 | 174 | 175 |
| | Equatorial Guinea | 121 | 123 | 124 | 147 | 167 | 175 |
| | Aruba | 107 | 109 | 139 | 166 | 171 | 174 |
| | Laos | 3 | 7 | 14 | 18 | 65 | 170 |
| | Benin | 104 | 108 | 128 | 159 | 161 | 161 |
| | Comoros | 146 | 147 | 147 | 147 | 147 | 150 |
| | Guinea-Bissau | 69 | 76 | 119 | 135 | 141 | 148 |
| | South Sudan | 117 | 119 | 120 | 130 | 133 | 133 |
| | Andorra | 127 | 128 | 130 | 130 | 130 | 131 |
| | Tajikistan | 91 | 122 | 125 | 125 | 125 | 125 |
| | Seychelles | 57 | 86 | 102 | 112 | 114 | 122 |
| East Timor | Timor-Leste | 24 | 26 | 72 | 117 | 122 | 122 |
| | Sierra Leone | 100 | 120 | 121 | 121 | 121 | 121 |
| | Antigua and Barbuda | 42 | 43 | 44 | 79 | 102 | 117 |
| | Bermuda | 33 | 33 | 33 | 72 | 101 | 106 |
| | Central African Republic | 98 | 98 | 100 | 100 | 100 | 101 |
| | Gibraltar | 94 | 94 | 97 | 97 | 98 | 98 |
| | San Marino | 90 | 90 | 90 | 91 | 92 | 93 |
| United States Virgin Islands | U.S. Virgin Islands | 30 | 37 | 54 | 71 | 81 | 86 |
| | Jersey | 69 | 69 | 77 | 78 | 80 | 81 |
| | Sint Maarten | 33 | 34 | 51 | 66 | 75 | 75 |
| | Saint Vincent and the Grenadines | 12 | 12 | 12 | 21 | 66 | 74 |
| | Isle of Man | 39 | 43 | 48 | 52 | 57 | 66 |
| | Eritrea | 23 | 35 | 38 | 42 | 45 | 60 |
| | Liechtenstein | 58 | 58 | 58 | 58 | 58 | 58 |
| | Brunei | 3 | 3 | 9 | 32 | 54 | 57 |
| | São Tomé and Príncipe | 37 | 37 | 37 | 50 | 56 | 56 |
| | New Zealand | 26 | 26 | 26 | 27 | 28 | 44 |
| | British Virgin Islands | 1 | 31 | 37 | 37 | 37 | 38 |
| France | Saint Martin | 27 | 30 | 17 | 35 | 37 | 38 |
| | Dominica | 0 | 0 | 4 | 20 | 32 | 37 |
| | Monaco | 33 | 33 | 35 | 35 | 36 | 36 |
| | Iceland | 30 | 30 | 33 | 33 | 33 | 35 |
| | Saint Kitts and Nevis | 3 | 3 | 3 | 13 | 23 | 28 |
| | Turks and Caicos Islands | 18 | 18 | 20 | 23 | 23 | 24 |
| | Guernsey | 17 | 17 | 18 | 21 | 23 | 23 |
| | Bonaire | 17 | 17 | 17 | 19 | 19 | 22 |
| | Burundi | 8 | 9 | 10 | 14 | 14 | 14 |
| | Faroe Islands | 1 | 1 | 2 | 2 | 2 | 13 |
| | Other | 13 | 13 | 13 | 13 | 13 | 13 |
| France | Wallis and Futuna | 7 | 7 | 7 | 7 | 7 | 7 |
| | Cayman Islands | 2 | 2 | 2 | 2 | 2 | 5 |
| France | Saint Barthélemy | 1 | 1 | 1 | 2 | 4 | 4 |
| | Anguilla | 0 | 0 | 0 | 1 | 1 | 3 |
| | Bhutan | 1 | 2 | 3 | 3 | 3 | 3 |
| | Northern Mariana Islands | 2 | 2 | 2 | 2 | 3 | 3 |
| | Montserrat | 1 | 1 | 1 | 1 | 1 | 1 |
| | American Samoa | 0 | 0 | 0 | 0 | 0 | 0 |
| | Cook Islands | 0 | 0 | 0 | 0 | 0 | 0 |
| | North Korea | 0 | 0 | 0 | 0 | 0 | 0 |
| | Falkland Islands | 0 | 0 | 0 | 0 | 0 | 0 |
| | Greenland | 0 | 0 | 0 | 0 | 0 | 0 |
| Vatican City | Holy See | 0 | 0 | 0 | 0 | 0 | 0 |
| | Kiribati | 0 | 0 | 0 | 0 | 0 | 0 |
| | Marshall Islands | 0 | 0 | 0 | 0 | 0 | 0 |
| | Federated States of Micronesia | 0 | 0 | 0 | 0 | 0 | 0 |
| | Nauru | 0 | 0 | 0 | 0 | 0 | 0 |
| | Niue | 0 | 0 | 0 | 0 | 0 | 0 |
| | Palau | 0 | 0 | 0 | 0 | 0 | 0 |
| | Pitcairn Islands | 0 | 0 | 0 | 0 | 0 | 0 |
| | Saba | 0 | 0 | 0 | 0 | 0 | 0 |
| | Saint Helena | 0 | 0 | 0 | 0 | 0 | 0 |
| France | Saint Pierre and Miquelon | 0 | 0 | 0 | 0 | 0 | 0 |
| | Samoa | 0 | 0 | 0 | 0 | 0 | 0 |
| | Sint Eustatius | 0 | 0 | 0 | 0 | 0 | 0 |
| | Solomon Islands | 0 | 0 | 0 | 0 | 0 | 0 |
| | Tokelau | 0 | 0 | 0 | 0 | 0 | 0 |
| | Tonga | 0 | 0 | 0 | 0 | 0 | 0 |
| | Turkmenistan | 0 | 0 | 0 | 0 | 0 | 0 |
| | Tuvalu | 0 | 0 | 0 | 0 | 0 | 0 |
| | Vanuatu | 0 | 0 | 0 | 0 | 0 | 0 |

=== Cases and deaths by region ===
Reporting standards vary enormously in different countries. No statistics are particularly accurate, but case and death rates in India (South Asia) and Sub-Saharan Africa in particular are probably much higher than reported.

COVID-19 cases and deaths by region, in absolute figures and rates per million inhabitants as of 25 December 2022

COVID-19 cases and deaths by region, in absolute figures and rates per million inhabitants as of 25 December 2022
| Region | Total cases | Total deaths | Cases per million | Deaths per million | Current weekly cases | Current weekly deaths | Population millions | Vaccinated % |
|---|---|---|---|---|---|---|---|---|
| European Union | 179,537,758 | 1,185,108 | 401,363 | 2,649 | 886,074 | 3,985 | 447 | 75.1 |
| North America | 103,783,777 | 1,133,607 | 281,404 | 3,074 | 476,376 | 2,975 | 369 | 76.1 |
| Other Europe | 57,721,948 | 498,259 | 247,054 | 2,133 | 74,354 | 248 | 234 | 61.2 |
| South America | 65,835,789 | 1,313,061 | 153,151 | 3,055 | 378,622 | 1,252 | 430 | 81.7 |
| Russia and Central Asia | 25,646,533 | 434,988 | 108,307 | 1,837 | 49,022 | 393 | 237 | 55.9 |
| Central America | 11,338,600 | 380,660 | 63,108 | 2,119 | 60,268 | 263 | 180 | 69.0 |
| Middle East | 22,549,784 | 238,106 | 86,400 | 912 | 13,457 | 65 | 261 | 51.9 |
| Oceania and islands in East Asia | 60,806,544 | 318,455 | 105,317 | 552 | 1,390,401 | 2,777 | 577 | 72.1 |
| Caribbean | 2,605,473 | 26,237 | 60,179 | 606 | 737 | 25 | 43 | 46.4 |
| South Asia | 50,347,136 | 620,218 | 27,121 | 334 | 1,911 | 24 | 1,856 | 69.4 |
| North Africa | 3,727,346 | 83,873 | 18,382 | 414 | 668 | 8 | 203 | 41.3 |
| East Asia | 57,867,768 | 189,910 | 32,416 | 106 | 644,079 | 818 | 1,785 | 87.2 |
| Sub-Saharan Africa | 8,636,456 | 172,907 | 7,598 | 152 | 6,960 | 27 | 1,137 | 27.6 |
| Totals (or average) | 650,404,912 | 6,595,389 | 83,826 | 850 | 3,982,929 | 12,860 | 7,759 | 67.0 |

New identified cases of COVID-19 weekly for top 7 regions in the world.

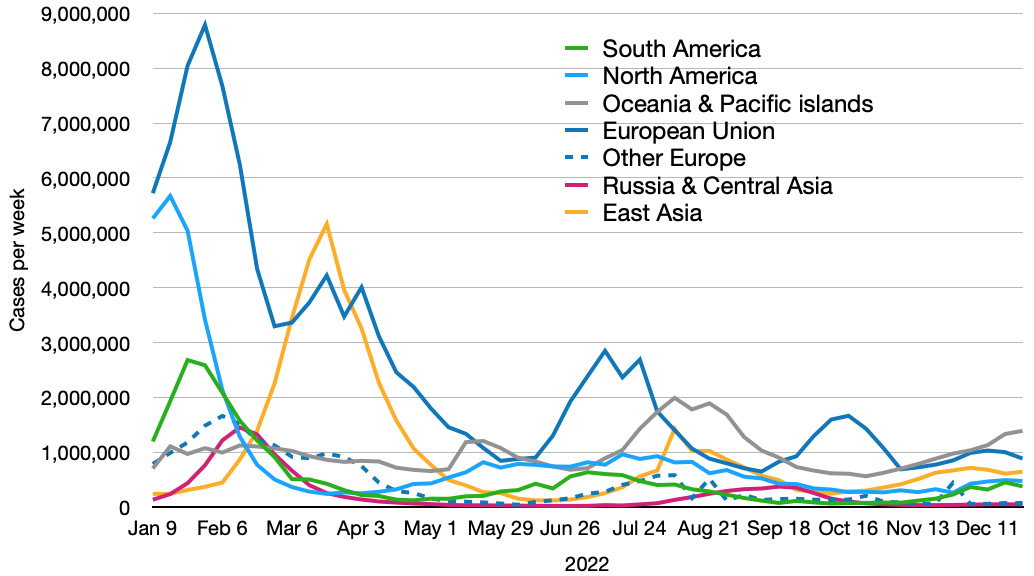

Deaths due to COVID-19 weekly for top 7 regions in the world.

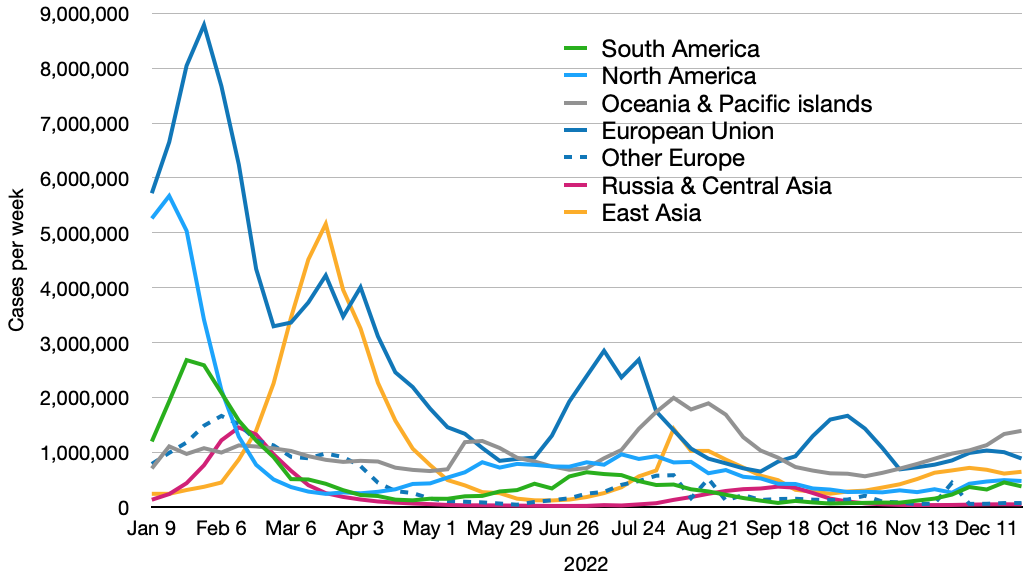

=== Vaccinations ===
Updated September 18, 2026.

COVID-19 vaccine distribution by country
| | Location | Vaccinated (Note: Number of people who have received at least one dose of a COVID-19 vaccine (unless noted otherwise).) | Percent (Note: Percentage of population that has received at least one dose of a COVID-19 vaccine. May include vaccination of non-citizens, which can push totals beyond 100% of the local population.) |
|---|---|---|---|
| | World (Note: Countries which do not report data for a column are not included in that column's world total.) (Note: Vaccination note: Countries which do not report the number of people who have received at least one dose are not included in the world total.) | 5,645,247,500 | 70.71% |
| (China) | China (Note: Does not include special administrative regions (Hong Kong and Macau) or Taiwan.) | 1,318,026,800 | 92.48% |
| (India) | India | 1,027,438,900 | 72.08% |
| (European Union) | European Union (Note: Data on member states of the European Union are individually listed, but are also summed here for convenience. They are not double-counted in world totals.) | 338,481,060 | 75.43% |
| (United States) | United States (Note: Vaccination note: Includes Freely Associated States) | 270,227,170 | 79.12% |
| (Indonesia) | Indonesia | 204,419,400 | 73.31% |
| (Brazil) | Brazil | 189,643,420 | 90.17% |
| (Pakistan) | Pakistan | 165,567,890 | 67.94% |
| (Bangladesh) | Bangladesh | 151,507,170 | 89.45% |
| (Japan) | Japan | 104,740,060 | 83.79% |
| (Mexico) | Mexico | 97,179,496 | 75.56% |
| (Nigeria) | Nigeria | 93,829,430 | 42.05% |
| (Vietnam) | Vietnam | 90,497,670 | 90.79% |
| (Russia) | Russia | 89,081,600 | 61.19% |
| (Philippines) | Philippines | 82,684,776 | 72.55% |
| (Iran) | Iran | 65,199,830 | 72.83% |
| (Germany) | Germany | 64,876,300 | 77.15% |
| (Turkey) | Turkey | 57,941,052 | 66.55% |
| (Thailand) | Thailand | 57,005,496 | 79.47% |
| (Egypt) | Egypt | 56,907,320 | 50.53% |
| (France) | France | 54,677,680 | 82.50% |
| (United Kingdom) | United Kingdom | 53,806,964 | 78.92% |
| (Ethiopia) | Ethiopia | 52,489,510 | 41.86% |
| (Italy) | Italy (Note: Vaccination note: Includes Vatican City) | 50,936,720 | 85.44% |
| (South Korea) | South Korea | 44,764,956 | 86.45% |
| (Colombia) | Colombia | 43,012,176 | 83.13% |
| (Myanmar) | Myanmar | 41,551,930 | 77.30% |
| (Argentina) | Argentina | 41,529,056 | 91.46% |
| (Spain) | Spain | 41,351,230 | 86.46% |
| (Canada) | Canada | 34,742,936 | 89.49% |
| (Tanzania) | Tanzania | 34,434,932 | 53.21% |
| (Peru) | Peru | 30,563,708 | 91.30% |
| (Malaysia) | Malaysia | 28,138,564 | 81.10% |
| (Nepal) | Nepal | 27,883,196 | 93.83% |
| (Saudi Arabia) | Saudi Arabia | 27,041,364 | 84.04% |
| (Morocco) | Morocco | 25,020,168 | 67.03% |
| (South Africa) | South Africa | 24,210,952 | 38.81% |
| (Poland) | Poland | 22,984,544 | 59.88% |
| (Mozambique) | Mozambique | 22,869,646 | 70.03% |
| (Australia) | Australia | 22,231,734 | 84.85% |
| (Venezuela) | Venezuela | 22,157,232 | 78.54% |
| (Uzbekistan) | Uzbekistan | 22,094,470 | 63.24% |
| (Taiwan) | Taiwan | 21,899,240 | 93.51% |
| (Uganda) | Uganda | 20,033,188 | 42.34% |
| (Afghanistan) | Afghanistan | 19,151,368 | 47.20% |
| (Chile) | Chile | 18,088,516 | 92.51% |
| (Sri Lanka) | Sri Lanka | 17,143,760 | 75.08% |
| (Democratic Republic of the Congo) | Democratic Republic of the Congo | 17,045,720 | 16.65% |
| (Angola) | Angola | 16,550,642 | 46.44% |
| (Ukraine) | Ukraine | 16,267,198 | 39.63% |
| (Ecuador) | Ecuador | 15,345,791 | 86.10% |
| (Cambodia) | Cambodia | 15,316,670 | 89.04% |
| (Sudan) | Sudan | 15,207,452 | 30.79% |
| (Kenya) | Kenya | 14,494,372 | 26.72% |
| (Ghana) | Ghana | 13,864,186 | 41.82% |
| (Ivory Coast) | Ivory Coast | 13,568,372 | 44.64% |
| (Netherlands) | Netherlands | 12,582,081 | 70.27% |
| (Zambia) | Zambia | 11,711,565 | 58.11% |
| (Iraq) | Iraq | 11,332,925 | 25.72% |
| (Rwanda) | Rwanda | 10,884,714 | 79.74% |
| (Kazakhstan) | Kazakhstan | 10,858,101 | 54.20% |
| (Cuba) | Cuba | 10,805,570 | 97.70% |
| (United Arab Emirates) | United Arab Emirates | 9,991,089 | 97.55% |
| (Portugal) | Portugal | 9,821,414 | 94.28% |
| (Belgium) | Belgium | 9,261,641 | 79.55% |
| (Somalia) | Somalia | 8,972,167 | 50.40% |
| (Guatemala) | Guatemala | 8,937,923 | 50.08% |
| (Tunisia) | Tunisia | 8,896,848 | 73.41% |
| (Guinea) | Guinea | 8,715,641 | 62.01% |
| (Greece) | Greece | 7,938,031 | 76.24% |
| (Algeria) | Algeria | 7,840,131 | 17.24% |
| (Sweden) | Sweden | 7,775,726 | 74.14% |
| (Zimbabwe) | Zimbabwe | 7,525,882 | 46.83% |
| (Dominican Republic) | Dominican Republic | 7,367,193 | 65.60% |
| (Bolivia) | Bolivia | 7,361,008 | 60.95% |
| (Israel) | Israel | 7,055,466 | 77.51% |
| (Czech Republic) | Czech Republic | 6,982,006 | 65.42% |
| (Hong Kong) | Hong Kong | 6,920,057 | 92.69% |
| (Austria) | Austria | 6,899,873 | 76.12% |
| (Honduras) | Honduras | 6,596,213 | 63.04% |
| (Belarus) | Belarus | 6,536,392 | 71.25% |
| (Hungary) | Hungary | 6,420,354 | 66.30% |
| (Nicaragua) | Nicaragua | 6,404,524 | 95.15% |
| (Niger) | Niger | 6,248,483 | 24.69% |
| (Switzerland) | Switzerland | 6,096,911 | 69.34% |
| (Burkina Faso) | Burkina Faso | 6,089,089 | 27.05% |
| (Laos) | Laos | 5,888,649 | 77.90% |
| (Sierra Leone) | Sierra Leone | 5,676,123 | 68.58% |
| (Romania) | Romania | 5,474,507 | 28.56% |
| (Malawi) | Malawi | 5,433,538 | 26.42% |
| (Azerbaijan) | Azerbaijan | 5,373,253 | 52.19% |
| (Tajikistan) | Tajikistan | 5,328,277 | 52.33% |
| (Singapore) | Singapore | 5,287,005 | 93.58% |
| (Chad) | Chad | 5,147,667 | 27.89% |
| (Jordan) | Jordan | 4,821,579 | 42.83% |
| (Denmark) | Denmark | 4,746,522 | 80.41% |
| (El Salvador) | El Salvador | 4,659,970 | 74.20% |
| (Costa Rica) | Costa Rica | 4,650,636 | 91.52% |
| (Turkmenistan) | Turkmenistan | 4,614,869 | 63.83% |
| (Finland) | Finland | 4,524,288 | 81.24% |
| (Mali) | Mali | 4,354,292 | 18.87% |
| (Norway) | Norway | 4,346,995 | 79.66% |
| (South Sudan) | South Sudan | 4,315,127 | 39.15% |
| (New Zealand) | New Zealand | 4,302,330 | 83.84% |
| (Republic of Ireland) | Republic of Ireland | 4,112,237 | 80.47% |
| (Paraguay) | Paraguay | 3,995,915 | 59.11% |
| (Liberia) | Liberia | 3,903,802 | 72.65% |
| (Cameroon) | Cameroon | 3,753,733 | 13.58% |
| (Panama) | Panama | 3,746,041 | 85.12% |
| (Benin) | Benin | 3,697,190 | 26.87% |
| (Kuwait) | Kuwait | 3,457,498 | 75.33% |
| (Serbia) | Serbia | 3,354,075 | 49.39% |
| (Syria) | Syria | 3,295,630 | 14.67% |
| (Oman) | Oman | 3,279,632 | 69.33% |
| (Uruguay) | Uruguay | 3,010,464 | 88.78% |
| (Qatar) | Qatar | 2,852,178 | 98.61% |
| (Slovakia) | Slovakia | 2,840,017 | 51.89% |
| (Lebanon) | Lebanon | 2,740,227 | 47.70% |
| (Madagascar) | Madagascar | 2,710,365 | 8.90% |
| (Senegal) | Senegal | 2,684,696 | 15.21% |
| (Central African Republic) | Central African Republic | 2,600,389 | 51.01% |
| (Croatia) | Croatia | 2,323,025 | 59.46% |
| (Libya) | Libya | 2,316,327 | 32.07% |
| (Mongolia) | Mongolia | 2,284,018 | 67.45% |
| (Togo) | Togo | 2,255,579 | 27.95% |
| (Bulgaria) | Bulgaria | 2,155,863 | 31.58% |
| (Mauritania) | Mauritania | 2,103,754 | 43.15% |
| (Palestine) | Palestine | 2,012,767 | 37.94% |
| (Lithuania) | Lithuania | 1,958,299 | 69.52% |
| (Botswana) | Botswana | 1,951,054 | 79.96% |
| (Kyrgyzstan) | Kyrgyzstan | 1,736,541 | 24.97% |
| (Georgia (country)) | Georgia | 1,654,504 | 43.60% |
| (Albania) | Albania | 1,349,255 | 47.72% |
| (Latvia) | Latvia | 1,346,184 | 71.57% |
| (Slovenia) | Slovenia | 1,265,802 | 59.84% |
| (Bahrain) | Bahrain | 1,241,174 | 80.94% |
| (Armenia) | Armenia | 1,150,915 | 39.95% |
| (Mauritius) | Mauritius | 1,123,773 | 88.06% |
| (Moldova) | Moldova | 1,109,524 | 36.50% |
| (Yemen) | Yemen | 1,050,202 | 2.75% |
| (Lesotho) | Lesotho | 1,014,073 | 44.36% |
| (Bosnia and Herzegovina) | Bosnia and Herzegovina | 943,394 | 29.44% |
| (Kosovo) | Kosovo | 906,858 | 52.79% |
| (Timor-Leste) | Timor-Leste | 886,838 | 64.77% |
| (Estonia) | Estonia | 870,202 | 64.45% |
| (Jamaica) | Jamaica | 859,773 | 30.28% |
| (North Macedonia) | North Macedonia | 854,570 | 46.44% |
| (Trinidad and Tobago) | Trinidad and Tobago | 754,399 | 50.43% |
| (Guinea-Bissau) | Guinea-Bissau | 747,057 | 35.48% |
| (Fiji) | Fiji | 712,025 | 77.44% |
| (Bhutan) | Bhutan | 699,116 | 89.52% |
| (Republic of the Congo) | Republic of the Congo | 695,760 | 11.53% |
| (Macau) | Macau | 679,703 | 96.50% |
| (The Gambia) | Gambia | 674,314 | 25.58% |
| (Cyprus) | Cyprus | 671,193 | 71.37% |
| (Namibia) | Namibia | 629,767 | 21.79% |
| (Eswatini) | Eswatini | 526,050 | 43.16% |
| (Haiti) | Haiti | 521,396 | 4.53% |
| (Guyana) | Guyana | 497,550 | 60.56% |
| (Luxembourg) | Luxembourg | 481,957 | 73.77% |
| (Malta) | Malta | 478,953 | 90.68% |
| (Brunei) | Brunei | 451,149 | 99.07% |
| (Comoros) | Comoros | 438,825 | 52.60% |
| (Djibouti) | Djibouti | 421,573 | 37.07% |
| (Maldives) | Maldives | 399,308 | 76.19% |
| (Papua New Guinea) | Papua New Guinea | 382,020 | 3.74% |
| (Cape Verde) | Cabo Verde | 356,734 | 68.64% |
| (Solomon Islands) | Solomon Islands | 343,821 | 44.02% |
| (Gabon) | Gabon | 311,244 | 12.80% |
| (Iceland) | Iceland | 309,770 | 81.44% |
| (Northern Cyprus) | Northern Cyprus | 301,673 | 78.80% |
| (Montenegro) | Montenegro | 292,783 | 47.63% |
| (Equatorial Guinea) | Equatorial Guinea | 270,109 | 14.98% |
| (Suriname) | Suriname | 267,820 | 42.98% |
| (Belize) | Belize | 258,473 | 64.18% |
| (New Caledonia) | New Caledonia | 192,375 | 67.00% |
| (Samoa) | Samoa | 191,403 | 88.91% |
| (French Polynesia) | French Polynesia | 190,908 | 68.09% |
| (Vanuatu) | Vanuatu | 176,624 | 56.42% |
| (The Bahamas) | Bahamas | 174,810 | 43.97% |
| (Barbados) | Barbados | 163,853 | 58.04% |
| (São Tomé and Príncipe) | Sao Tome and Principe | 140,256 | 61.97% |
| (Curaçao) | Curaçao | 108,601 | 58.59% |
| (Kiribati) | Kiribati | 100,900 | 77.33% |
| (Aruba) | Aruba | 90,546 | 84.00% |
| (Seychelles) | Seychelles | 88,520 | 70.52% |
| (Tonga) | Tonga | 87,375 | 83.17% |
| (Jersey) | Jersey | 84,365 | 81.52% |
| (Isle of Man) | Isle of Man | 69,560 | 82.66% |
| (Antigua and Barbuda) | Antigua and Barbuda | 64,290 | 69.24% |
| (Cayman Islands) | Cayman Islands | 62,113 | 86.74% |
| (Saint Lucia) | Saint Lucia | 60,140 | 33.64% |
| (Andorra) | Andorra | 57,913 | 72.64% |
| (Guernsey) | Guernsey | 54,223 | 85.06% |
| (Bermuda) | Bermuda | 48,554 | 74.96% |
| (Grenada) | Grenada | 44,241 | 37.84% |
| (Gibraltar) | Gibraltar | 42,175 | 112.08% |
| (Faroe Islands) | Faroe Islands | 41,715 | 77.19% |
| (Greenland) | Greenland | 41,227 | 73.60% |
| (Saint Vincent and the Grenadines) | Saint Vincent and the Grenadines | 37,532 | 36.77% |
| (Burundi) | Burundi | 36,909 | 0.28% |
| (Saint Kitts and Nevis) | Saint Kitts and Nevis | 33,794 | 72.31% |
| (Dominica) | Dominica | 32,995 | 49.36% |
| (Turks and Caicos Islands) | Turks and Caicos Islands | 32,815 | 71.54% |
| (Sint Maarten) | Sint Maarten | 29,788 | 70.65% |
| (Monaco) | Monaco | 28,875 | 74.13% |
| (Liechtenstein) | Liechtenstein | 26,771 | 68.05% |
| (San Marino) | San Marino | 26,357 | 77.26% |
| (British Virgin Islands) | British Virgin Islands | 19,466 | 50.76% |
| (Caribbean Netherlands) | Caribbean Netherlands | 19,109 | 66.69% |
| (Cook Islands) | Cook Islands | 15,112 | 102.48% |
| (Nauru) | Nauru | 13,106 | 110.86% |
| (Anguilla) | Anguilla | 10,858 | 76.45% |
| (Tuvalu) | Tuvalu | 9,763 | 97.51% |
| (Wallis and Futuna) | Wallis and Futuna | 7,150 | 62.17% |
| (Saint Helena, Ascension and Tristan da Cunha) | Saint Helena, Ascension and Tristan da Cunha | 4,361 | 81.23% |
| (Falkland Islands) | Falkland Islands | 2,632 | 74.88% |
| (Tokelau) | Tokelau | 2,203 | 95.29% |
| (Montserrat) | Montserrat | 2,104 | 47.01% |
| (Niue) | Niue | 1,638 | 88.83% |
| (Pitcairn Islands) | Pitcairn Islands | 47 | 100.00% |
| (North Korea) | North Korea | 0 | 0.00% |

== By continent ==
As a result of COVID-19 many regions have imposed lockdowns, curfews, and quarantines alongside new legislation and evacuations, or other restrictions for citizens of or recent travelers to the most affected areas. Other regions have imposed global restrictions that apply to all foreign countries and territories, or prevent their own citizens from travelling overseas.

=== Africa ===
Confirmed cases in Africa as of 23 May 2021 1–99 confirmed cases 100–999 confirmed cases 1,000–9,999 confirmed cases 10,000–99,999 confirmed cases 100,000+ confirmed cases

The pandemic was confirmed to have spread to Africa on 14 February 2020, with the first confirmed case announced in Egypt. The first confirmed case in sub-Saharan Africa was announced in Nigeria at the end of February 2020. Within three months, the virus had spread throughout the continent, as Lesotho, the last African sovereign state to have remained free of the virus, reported a case on 13 May 2020. By 26 May, it appeared that most African countries were experiencing community transmission, although testing capacity was limited. Most of the identified imported cases arrived from Europe and the United States rather than from China where the virus originated.

In early June 2021, Africa faced a third wave of COVID infections with cases rising in 14 countries. By 4 July the continent recorded more than 251,000 new Covid cases, a 20% increase from the prior week and a 12% increase from the January peak. More than sixteen African countries, including Malawi and Senegal, recorded an uptick in new cases. The World Health Organization labelled it Africa's 'Worst Pandemic Week Ever'.

The government of Egypt denied January 2021 allegations that the shortage of oxygen had killed several COVID-19 patients at one of its hospitals. However, an investigation led by The New York Times confirmed that the authorities had lied. The video of one of Egypt's hospitals treating critical patients using manual ventilation methods went viral on Facebook. The video was posted by Ahmed Nafei, the nephew of a 62-year-old woman who died. In addition, the relatives of the dead patients and the El Husseineya Central Hospital's medical staff also confirmed in an interview given to The New York Times that the cause of death had been the shortage of oxygen.

=== Antarctica ===
Due to its remoteness and sparse population, Antarctica was the last continent to have confirmed cases of COVID-19 and was one of the last regions of the world affected directly by the pandemic. The first cases were reported in December 2020, almost a year after the first cases of COVID-19 were detected in China. At least 36 people are confirmed to have been infected.

=== Asia ===
COVID-19 deaths per million residents in Asia as of 10 December 2020: ≥ 800 600–799 300–599 / 200–299 100–199 <100

The COVID-19 pandemic began in Asia in Wuhan, Hubei, China, and has spread widely through the continent. As of 9 October 2026, at least one case of COVID-19 had been reported in every country in Asia except Turkmenistan.

The Asian countries with the highest numbers of confirmed coronavirus cases are India, South Korea, Turkey, Vietnam, and Iran. Despite being the first area of the world hit by the outbreak, the early wide-scale response of some Asian states, particularly Bhutan, Singapore, Taiwan, and Vietnam has allowed them to fare comparatively well. China was criticised for initially minimising the severity of the outbreak, but its wide-scale response has largely contained the disease since March 2020.

As of July 2021, the highest numbers of deaths are recorded in India, Indonesia, Iran, and Turkey, each with more than 90,000 deaths and more than 900,000 deaths combined. However, the death toll in Iran and Indonesia are claimed to be much higher than the official figures. Per capita, the highest deaths have been disproportionally in several Western Asian states, with Georgia having the highest figure closely followed by Armenia, and Iran in third, whereas China had the lowest.

=== Europe ===
COVID-19 deaths per million residents in Europe as of 5 February 2022

The global COVID-19 pandemic arrived in Europe with its first confirmed case in Bordeaux, France, on 24 January 2020, and subsequently spread widely across the continent. By 17 March 2020, every country in Europe had confirmed a case, and all have reported at least one death, with the exception of Vatican City.

=== North America ===
The first cases of the COVID-19 pandemic in North America were reported in the United States on 23 January 2020. Saint Kitts and Nevis was the last North American country to report a case of COVID-19, doing so on 25 March. Bonaire confirmed a case on 16 April, becoming the last territory to do so.

On 26 March 2020, the United States became the country in North America with the highest number of confirmed COVID-19 infections, at over 82,000 cases. On 11 April 2020, the United States became the country in North America with the highest official death toll for COVID-19, at over 20,000 deaths. As of 10 April 2022, there are about 97 million cases and about 1.4 million deaths in North America; about 88.9 million have recovered from COVID-19, meaning that nearly 11 out of 12 cases have recovered or that the recovery rate is nearly 92%.

As of 15 December 2023, the United States has had the highest number of cases in North America, at over 103 million cases, as well as the highest death toll, at over a million deaths. There have been nearly 75.7 million recoveries in the United States as of 15 December 2023, meaning that nearly 12 out of 13 cases in the country have recovered or that the recovery rate is about 92%. On 20 March 2022, the number of COVID-19 deaths in the United States exceeded a million.

As of 15 December 2023, Canada has reported over 4.7 million cases and over 53,000 deaths, while Mexico, which was overtaken in terms of the number of cases on 11 March 2022, the second anniversary of the day when the COVID-19 outbreak became a pandemic, by Japan, the second most affected country in East Asia, has reported about 5.7 million cases and about 320,000 deaths. The state in the United States with the highest number of cases and the highest death toll is California, at about 9.1 million cases and nearly 90,000 deaths as of 10 April 2022.

=== Oceania ===
Confirmed cases in Oceania as of 31 July 2021 1–9 confirmed cases 10–99 confirmed cases 100–999 confirmed cases 1000–9999 confirmed cases 10,000+ confirmed cases

The COVID-19 pandemic was confirmed to have reached Oceania on 25 January 2020 with the first confirmed case reported in Melbourne, Australia. The virus has spread to all sovereign states and territories in the region. Australia and New Zealand were praised for their handling of the pandemic in comparison to other Western nations, with New Zealand and each state in Australia wiping out all community transmission of the virus several times even after re-introduction in the community.

As a result of the high transmissibility of the Delta variant however, by August 2021, the Australian states of New South Wales and Victoria had conceded defeat in their eradication efforts. In early October 2021, New Zealand also abandoned its elimination strategy.

=== South America ===
Confirmed cases in South America as of 21 March 2021 1–499 confirmed cases 500–999 1,000–1,999 2,000–4,999 5,000–9,999 10,000–49,999 50,000–99,999 100,000–199,999 200,000+ confirmed cases

The pandemic was confirmed to have reached South America on 26 February 2020 when Brazil confirmed a case in São Paulo. By 3 April, all countries and territories in South America had recorded at least one case.

On 13 May 2020, it was reported that Latin America and the Caribbean had reported over 400,000 cases of COVID-19 infection with, 23,091 deaths. On 22 May 2020, citing the rapid increase of infections in Brazil, the WHO declared South America the epicentre of the pandemic.

As of 12 January 2023, South America had recorded 67,331,547 confirmed cases and 1,344,031 deaths from COVID-19. Due to a shortage of testing and medical facilities, it is believed that the outbreak is far larger than the official numbers show.

== At sea ==
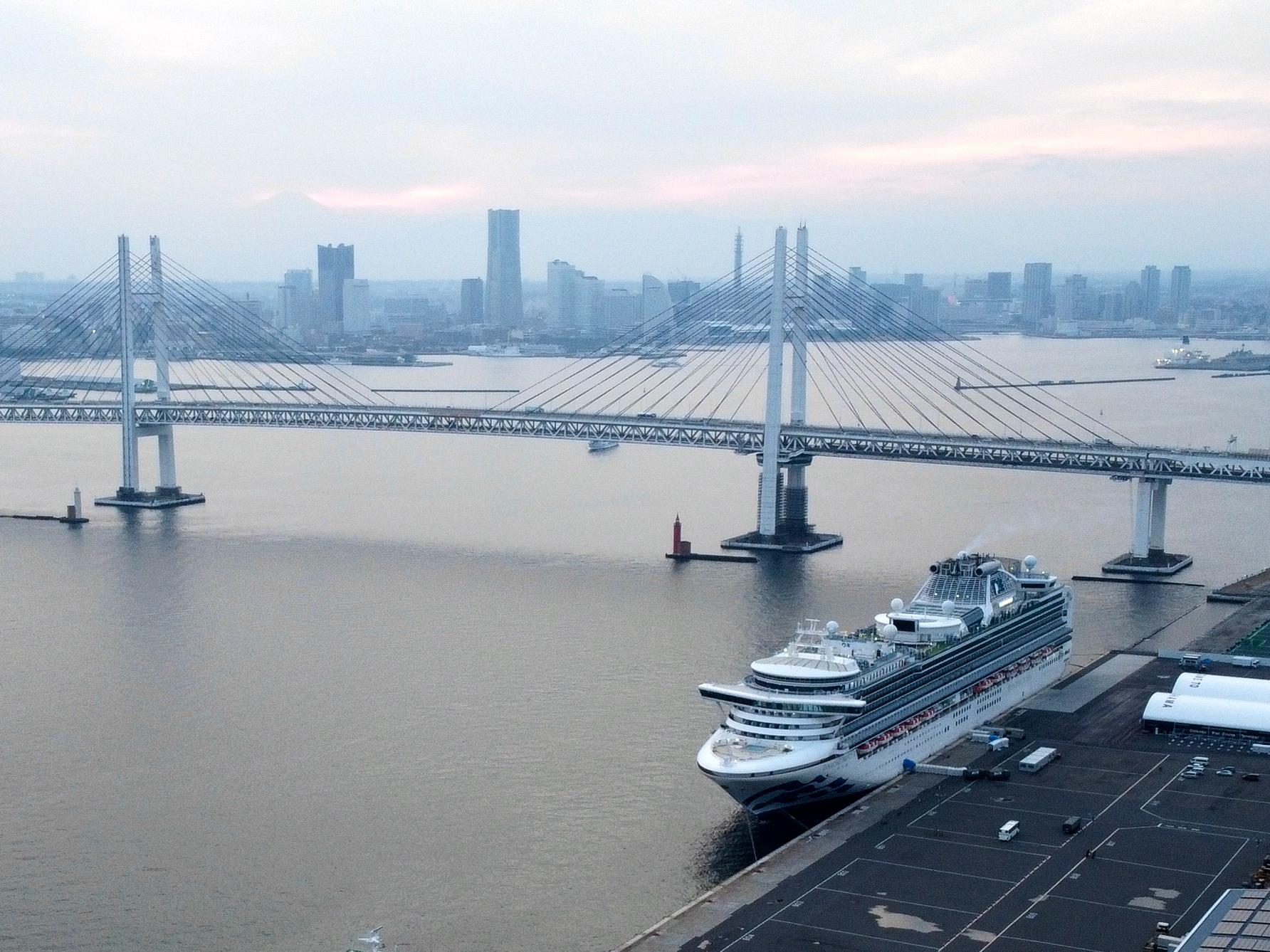
Diamond Princess undergoing a cleaning and disinfection process at Daikoku Pier in Yokohama Port photographed on 1 March 2020

Early in 2020, in the early days of the COVID-19 pandemic, the disease spread to a number of cruise ships, with the nature of such ships – including crowded semi-enclosed areas, increased exposure to new environments, and limited medical resources – contributing to the heightened risk and rapid spread of the disease.

The British-registered Diamond Princess was the first cruise ship to have a major outbreak on board, with the ship quarantined at Yokohama from 4 February 2020 for about a month. Of 3711 passengers and crew, around 700 people became infected and 9 people died. With that, many cruise lines suspended their operations to mitigate the spread of the pandemic and were replaced by "cruises to nowhere" that had no stops.

The COVID-19 pandemic spread to many military ships. The nature of these ships, which includes working with others in small enclosed areas and a lack of private quarters for the vast majority of crew, contributed to the rapid spread of the disease, even more so than on cruise ships.

Due to the nature of operations security, national militaries may have policies in place that prevent or restrict reporting of SARS-CoV-2 infections and COVID-19 deaths, so although the cases listed below may have been widely reported in reliable sources, confirmation by official spokespeople of the respective militaries is not systematic.

== Timeline of first confirmed cases by country or territory ==
First confirmed COVID-19 cases by country or territory
| Date | Countries / Territories |
|---|---|
| 1 December 2019 (Note: While the index case was confirmed on 1 December 2019, further investigation opened up the possibility of the infection to have taken place earlier.) | China |
| 13 January 2020 | Thailand |
| 16 January 2020 | Japan |
| 20 January 2020 | South Korea • United States |
| 21 January 2020 | Taiwan (Note: Non-member of the United Nations with limited recognition by some UN member states.) |
| 22 January 2020 | Hong Kong (Note: Special administrative region of China.) • Macau |
| 23 January 2020 | Nepal • Singapore • Vietnam |
| 24 January 2020 | France |
| 25 January 2020 | Australia • Canada • Malaysia |
| 27 January 2020 | Cambodia • Germany • Sri Lanka |
| 29 January 2020 | Finland • United Arab Emirates |
| 30 January 2020 | India • Italy • Philippines |
| 31 January 2020 | Russia • Spain • Sweden • United Kingdom |
| 3 February 2020 | Belgium |
| 14 February 2020 | Egypt |
| 19 February 2020 | Iran |
| 21 February 2020 | Israel • Lebanon |
| 24 February 2020 | Afghanistan • Bahrain • Iraq • Kuwait • Oman |
| 25 February 2020 | Algeria • Austria • Brazil • Croatia • Switzerland |
| 26 February 2020 | Georgia • Greece • North Macedonia • Norway • Pakistan • Romania |
| 27 February 2020 | Denmark • Estonia • Netherlands • Nigeria • San Marino |
| 28 February 2020 | Azerbaijan • Belarus • Iceland • Lithuania • Mexico • Monaco • New Zealand |
| 29 February 2020 | Ecuador • Ireland • Luxembourg • Qatar |
| 1 March 2020 | Armenia • Czechia • Dominican Republic • Saint Barthélemy (Note: Overseas collectivity of France.) • Saint Martin |
| 2 March 2020 | Andorra • Indonesia • Jordan • Latvia • Morocco • Portugal • Saudi Arabia • Senegal • Tunisia |
| 3 March 2020 | Argentina • Chile • Gibraltar (Note: British Overseas Territory.) • Liechtenstein • Ukraine |
| 4 March 2020 | Faroe Islands (Note: Autonomous territory of the Kingdom of Denmark.) • French Guiana (Note: Overseas region of France.) • Hungary • Poland • Slovenia |
| 5 March 2020 | Bosnia and Herzegovina • Martinique • Palestine • South Africa |
| 6 March 2020 | Bhutan • Cameroon • Colombia • Costa Rica • Peru • Serbia • Slovakia • Togo • Vatican City |
| 7 March 2020 | Maldives • Malta • Moldova • Paraguay |
| 8 March 2020 | Albania • Bangladesh • Bulgaria |
| 9 March 2020 | Brunei • Cyprus • Guernsey (Note: British Crown Dependency.) • Panama |
| 10 March 2020 | Bolivia • Burkina Faso • DR Congo • Jamaica • Jersey • Mongolia • Northern Cyprus |
| 11 March 2020 | Cuba • French Polynesia • Guyana • Honduras • Ivory Coast • Réunion • Turkey |
| 12 March 2020 | Saint Vincent and the Grenadines • Trinidad and Tobago |
| 13 March 2020 | Antigua and Barbuda • Aruba (Note: Constituent country of the Kingdom of the Netherlands.) • Cayman Islands • Curaçao • Ethiopia • Gabon • Ghana • Guadeloupe • Guatemala • Guinea • Kazakhstan • Kenya • Kosovo • Puerto Rico (Note: Territory of the United States.) • Saint Lucia • Sudan • Suriname • United States Virgin Islands • Uruguay • Venezuela |
| 14 March 2020 | Central African Republic • Congo • Equatorial Guinea • Eswatini • Mauritania • Mayotte • Namibia • Rwanda • Seychelles |
| 15 March 2020 | Akrotiri and Dhekelia (Note: Permanent Cypriot population, as well as British military personnel and their families.) • Bahamas • Guam • Uzbekistan |
| 16 March 2020 | Benin • Greenland • Liberia • Somalia • Tanzania |
| 17 March 2020 | Barbados • Gambia • Montenegro • Sint Maarten |
| 18 March 2020 | Bermuda • Djibouti • El Salvador • Kyrgyzstan • Mauritius • Montserrat • New Caledonia (Note: Sui generis collectivity of France.) • Nicaragua • Zambia |
| 19 March 2020 | Angola • Chad • Fiji • Haiti • Isle of Man • Niger |
| 20 March 2020 | Cape Verde • Madagascar • Papua New Guinea • Timor-Leste • Uganda • Zimbabwe |
| 21 March 2020 | Eritrea • Transnistria (Note: Non-member of the United Nations with limited recognition only by other non-UN states.) |
| 22 March 2020 | Åland (Note: Autonomous county of Finland.) • Dominica • Grenada • Mozambique • Syria |
| 23 March 2020 | Belize • Myanmar • Turks and Caicos Islands |
| 24 March 2020 | Laos • Libya |
| 25 March 2020 | British Virgin Islands • Guinea-Bissau • Mali • Saint Kitts and Nevis |
| 26 March 2020 | Anguilla |
| 28 March 2020 | Northern Mariana Islands |
| 30 March 2020 | Botswana |
| 31 March 2020 | Burundi • Donetsk People's Republic (Note: Former Russian puppet state illegally annexed by Russia in 2022 and recognized internationally as part of Ukraine.) • Luhansk People's Republic • Sierra Leone • Sint Eustatius (Note: Special municipality of the Netherlands.) • Somaliland (Note: Non-member of the United Nations not recognised by any other state.) |
| 2 April 2020 | Malawi |
| 3 April 2020 | Falkland Islands |
| 4 April 2020 | Western Sahara (Note: Non-Self-Governing Territory as defined by the United Nations Charter. The first case was confirmed in the Laâyoune-Sakia El Hamra region in the Moroccan-controlled part.) (Note: Subject of territorial dispute.) |
| 5 April 2020 | Saint Pierre and Miquelon • South Sudan |
| 6 April 2020 | São Tomé and Príncipe |
| 7 April 2020 | Abkhazia • Artsakh |
| 10 April 2020 | Yemen |
| 11 April 2020 | Saba |
| 16 April 2020 | Bonaire |
| 30 April 2020 | Comoros • Tajikistan |
| 6 May 2020 | South Ossetia |
| 13 May 2020 | Lesotho |
| 25 July 2020 | Sahrawi Arab Democratic Republic |
| 7 September 2020 | Saint Helena, Ascension and Tristan da Cunha |
| 3 October 2020 | Solomon Islands |
| 16 October 2020 | Wallis and Futuna |
| 28 October 2020 | Marshall Islands |
| November 2020 | British Indian Ocean Territory |
| 9 November 2020 | American Samoa |
| 11 November 2020 | Vanuatu |
| 18 November 2020 | Samoa |
| 21 December 2020 | Antarctica (Note: De facto condominium governed by the signatories to the Antarctic Treaty System.) |
| 8 January 2021 | Federated States of Micronesia |
| 18 May 2021 | Kiribati |
| 31 May 2021 | Palau |
| 6 October 2021 | Svalbard (Note: Unincorporated area of Norway.) |
| 29 October 2021 | Tonga |
| 3 December 2021 | Cook Islands (Note: State in free association with New Zealand.) |
| 30 December 2021 | Norfolk Island (Note: External territory of Australia.) |
| 6 March 2022 | Christmas Island |
| 9 March 2022 | Niue |
| 19 March 2022 | Cocos (Keeling) Islands |
| 2 April 2022 | Nauru |
| 8 May 2022 (Note: Some foreign analysts believe the virus had spread there by March 2020. A soldier who was shot crossing the China-North Korea border on 20 April 2020 tested positive after being brought to a hospital in China, lending strong evidence to the existence of cases in the country.) | North Korea |
| 20 May 2022 | Tuvalu |
| 16 July 2022 | Pitcairn Islands |
| 20 December 2022 | Tokelau (Note: Non-self-governing territory of New Zealand.) |

== States with no confirmed cases ==
As of March 2023, Turkmenistan in Central Asia is the only sovereign state in the world which has not reported any confirmed cases of COVID-19. Cases are strongly suspected, but none have been officially reported. Private citizens have reported hospitals being overwhelmed with patients showing COVID-19-like symptoms, including a very large outbreak in a women's prison that apparently began September 2020. The Turkmenistan government has instead reported a large increase in atypical pneumonia cases.

The last territory in the world to have its first COVID infection was Tokelau, a dependency of New Zealand that reported five cases on 20 December 2022.

== See also ==
- COVID-19 pandemic death rates by country
