= COVID-19 pandemic in the British Overseas Territories =

Ongoing COVID-19 viral pandemic in the British Overseas Territories

COVID-19 pandemic in British Overseas Territories
- Disease: COVID-19
- Pathogen: SARS-CoV-2
- Location: British Overseas Territories

This article lists links to articles relating to the COVID-19 pandemic within the British Overseas Territories. The COVID-19 pandemic was said to have exacerbated pre-existing tensions between the territories and London.

The UK Government was responsible for the procurement and distribution of vaccines to the territories, and offered financial support to the territories during the pandemic. In March 2020, the UK government enacted Operation Broadshare, a military operation address the COVID-19 pandemic overseas, primarily in the British Overseas Territories.

== Africa ==
- Saint Helena, Ascension and Tristan da Cunha

== Asia ==
- Akrotiri and Dhekelia
- British Indian Ocean Territory

== Europe ==
- Gibraltar

== North America ==
- Anguilla
- Bermuda
- British Virgin Islands
- Cayman Islands
- Montserrat
- Turks and Caicos Islands

== South America ==
- Falkland Islands

== British Overseas Territories without confirmed cases ==
#	Territory	Population
1	British Antarctic Territory	400
2	South Georgia and the South Sandwich Islands	20
3	Pitcairn	40
4	Saint Helena	4,439
