= COVID-19 pandemic in Saint Pierre and Miquelon =

Ongoing COVID-19 viral pandemic in Saint Pierre and Miquelon

- Disease: COVID-19
- Pathogen: SARS-CoV-2
- Location: Saint Pierre and Miquelon
- Index case: Saint-Pierre
- Arrival date: 5 September 2021 (6 years, 1 month, 1 week and 6 days)
- Confirmed cases: 1,225
- Deaths: 2

Government website
- http://www.saint-pierre-et-miquelon.gouv.fr/Publications/Coronavirus-Covid-19

The COVID-19 pandemic was confirmed to have reached the French overseas collectivity of Saint Pierre and Miquelon on 5 April 2020. Earlier, ferry service between Newfoundland and Saint Pierre and Miquelon had been suspended. Air and ferry service between the islands of St. Pierre and Miquelon have been reduced. The tourism sector is expected to be affected by the pandemic and related measures. The collectivity was placed under lockdown on 17 March 2020.

== Background ==
On 12 January 2020, the World Health Organization (WHO) confirmed that a novel coronavirus was the cause of a respiratory illness in a cluster of people in Wuhan City, Hubei Province, China, which was reported to the WHO on 31 December 2019.

The case fatality ratio for COVID-19 has been much lower than SARS of 2003, but the transmission has been significantly greater, with a significant total death toll.

== Timeline ==
Cases

Deaths

=== April 2020 ===
On 5 April, the first case was confirmed in the collectivity.

On 25 April, the Overseas Minister announced a gradual deconfinement in Saint Pierre and Miquelon starting Monday 27 April. The majority of businesses were reopened except for bars and restaurants. Schools were reopened in the first week of May. Travel between the two islands resumed on 11 May. Restrictions on sports and gatherings remained in place and there has been review of the deconfinement every two weeks.

=== May 2020 ===
On 4 May, it was reported that the more than 270 students stranded in metropolitan France and Canada would return to Saint Pierre and Miquelon from 12 May onward. They were quarantined for 14 days and tested. The students in metropolitan France were repatriated in two groups.

=== 2021 ===
In April 2021, restrictions to travel to both Metropolitan France and Canada remained in place. The islands had been declared Covid-free in February, and requested inclusion in Canada's Atlantic Bubble, although this was not successful.

=== 2022 ===
By the end of July, a total of 3,083 cases had been confirmed.

== See also ==
- COVID-19 pandemic in North America
- COVID-19 pandemic by country and territory
