= COVID-19 pandemic in Martinique =

Ongoing COVID-19 viral pandemic in Martinique, France

- Disease: COVID-19
- Pathogen: SARS-CoV-2
- Location: Martinique
- Arrival date: 5 March 2020 (6 years, 2 months, 1 week and 6 days)
- Confirmed cases: 230,354
- Recovered: 228,709
- Deaths: 1,104

Government website
- https://www.martinique.ars.sante.fr/

The COVID-19 pandemic in Martinique was a part of the ongoing global viral pandemic of coronavirus disease 2019 (COVID-19), which was confirmed to have reached the French overseas department and region of Martinique on 5 March 2020.

As of 25 March 2022, 142,024 COVID-19 cases and 910 deaths are confirmed in Martinique.

== Background ==
On 12 January 2020, the World Health Organization (WHO) confirmed that a novel coronavirus was the cause of a respiratory illness in a cluster of people in Wuhan City, Hubei Province, China, which was reported to the WHO on 31 December 2019.

The case fatality ratio for COVID-19 has been much lower than SARS of 2003, but the transmission has been significantly greater, with a significant total death toll.

== Timeline ==
Cases

Deaths

On 5 March 2020, the first two cases of COVID-19 were confirmed. By 15 March, the first virus-related death had occurred and there were 15 infected patients in Martinique.

On 20 March 2020, the prefect of Martinique issued a restrictive decree prohibiting, for a month, access to all the beaches and rivers of the island, as well as prohibiting hiking.

On 13 July 2021, a protest was held outside the prefecture in Fort de France against curfew and the requirement for the health care practitioners to be vaccinated.

On 30 July 2021, Martinique reentered lockdown. Shops are closed, except for food shops and pharmacies.

On 10 Aug 2021, a tighter lockdown was imposed to help prevent hospitals from being overwhelmed by a fourth wave of infections.

== See also ==
- COVID-19 pandemic
- COVID-19 pandemic by country and territory
- COVID-19 pandemic in South America
