= COVID-19 pandemic in Tokelau =

- Disease: COVID-19
- Pathogen: SARS-CoV-2
- Location: Tokelau
- First outbreak: Wuhan, China
- Index case: Atafu
- Arrival date: 20 December 2022
- Confirmed cases: 80
- Deaths: 0
- Fatality rate: 0%
- Vaccinations: 2,203 (fully vaccinated)

The COVID-19 pandemic in Tokelau was part of the worldwide pandemic of coronavirus disease 2019 (COVID-19) caused by severe acute respiratory syndrome coronavirus 2 (SARS-CoV-2). Tokelau reported its first confirmed cases on 20 December 2022. COVID-19 reached all three of Tokelau's main atolls in July 2023, when the government confirmed the community spread of the virus on Fakaofo, the last atoll without infections.

== Background ==
On 12 January 2020, the World Health Organization (WHO) confirmed that a novel coronavirus was the cause of a respiratory illness in a cluster of people in Wuhan, Hubei Province, China, which was reported to the WHO on 31 December 2019.

The case fatality ratio for COVID-19 has been much lower than SARS of 2003, but the transmission has been significantly greater, with a significant total death toll.

Tokelau consists of three atolls Atafu, Fakaofo and Nukunonu, with a total population of less than 2,000. New Zealand assumed control of the Tokelau Islands from the United Kingdom in 1926, and incorporated them into New Zealand's territorial boundaries in 1948. Two referendums were held in 2006 and 2007 to upgrade the territory's status to a free associated state similar to the Cook Islands and Niue, which are associated states connected to New Zealand. However, both referendums failed to achieve the two-thirds majority need to advance to free association and Tokelau remains a dependent territory. Tokelau is governed by a legislative body known as the General Fono with each of the three atolls having a taupulega (village councils). The New Zealand Government provides "broad but distant oversight" over the dependency.

== Timeline ==
On 20 December 2022, Tokelau reported its first five cases of COVID-19 at the border of its northernmost atoll of Atafu.

On 22 May 2023, Tokelau reported its first community case on Nukunonu, the dependency's largest atoll. In response, local authorities imposed a lockdown. By 26 May, Tokelau had reported a total of four community cases. By 29 May, Tokelau had reported a total of two border cases and six community cases. Nukunonu ended its lockdown period.

By 20 July, Tokelau had reported 50 community cases in all of Tokelau's three atolls. Kelihiano Kalolo, the Head of the Government of Tokelau, confirmed the territory's first community outbreak in the Fakaofo atoll. In addition, an entire village was tested after a man who visited Fanuafala hospital tested positive for COVID-19.

== Responses ==
On 21 March 2023, Stuff reported that Tokelau was still closing its borders three years after the COVID-19 pandemic began in March 2020. Under the dependency's border policies, only New Zealand citizens (Tokelauans are considered New Zealanders) and a limited number of essential workers, who have to apply for exemption, are allowed to enter Tokelau. All travellers are required to undergo a seven-day quarantine. Tokelau Covid-19 response chairman Aukusitino Vitale justified Tokelau's border restrictions, citing the limited capabity of the dependency's health infrastructure, health work force, and small population.

== COVID-19 vaccination efforts ==
On 19 July 2021, the Royal New Zealand Navy warship HMNZS Wellington delivered 120 vials of the Pfizer–BioNTech COVID-19 vaccine to Tokelau's Nukunonu atoll, which is sufficient to vaccinate 720 people. Tokelau's population was 1,499 according to the 2016 Census. By 2 August 2022, Tokelau had reported to the WHO that 998 vaccine doses had been administered.

== See also ==
- COVID-19 pandemic in Oceania
