= COVID-19 pandemic in the Pitcairn Islands =

Status of the COVID-19 viral pandemic in the Pitcairn Islands

- Disease: COVID-19
- Pathogen: SARS-CoV-2
- Location: Pitcairn Islands
- First outbreak: Wuhan, China
- Index case: Pitcairn
- Arrival date: 16 July 2022
- Confirmed cases: 4
- Deaths: 0
- Fatality rate: 0%
- Vaccinations: 47 (fully vaccinated)

Government website
- Government of Pitcairn Island Travel and Quarantine Policy

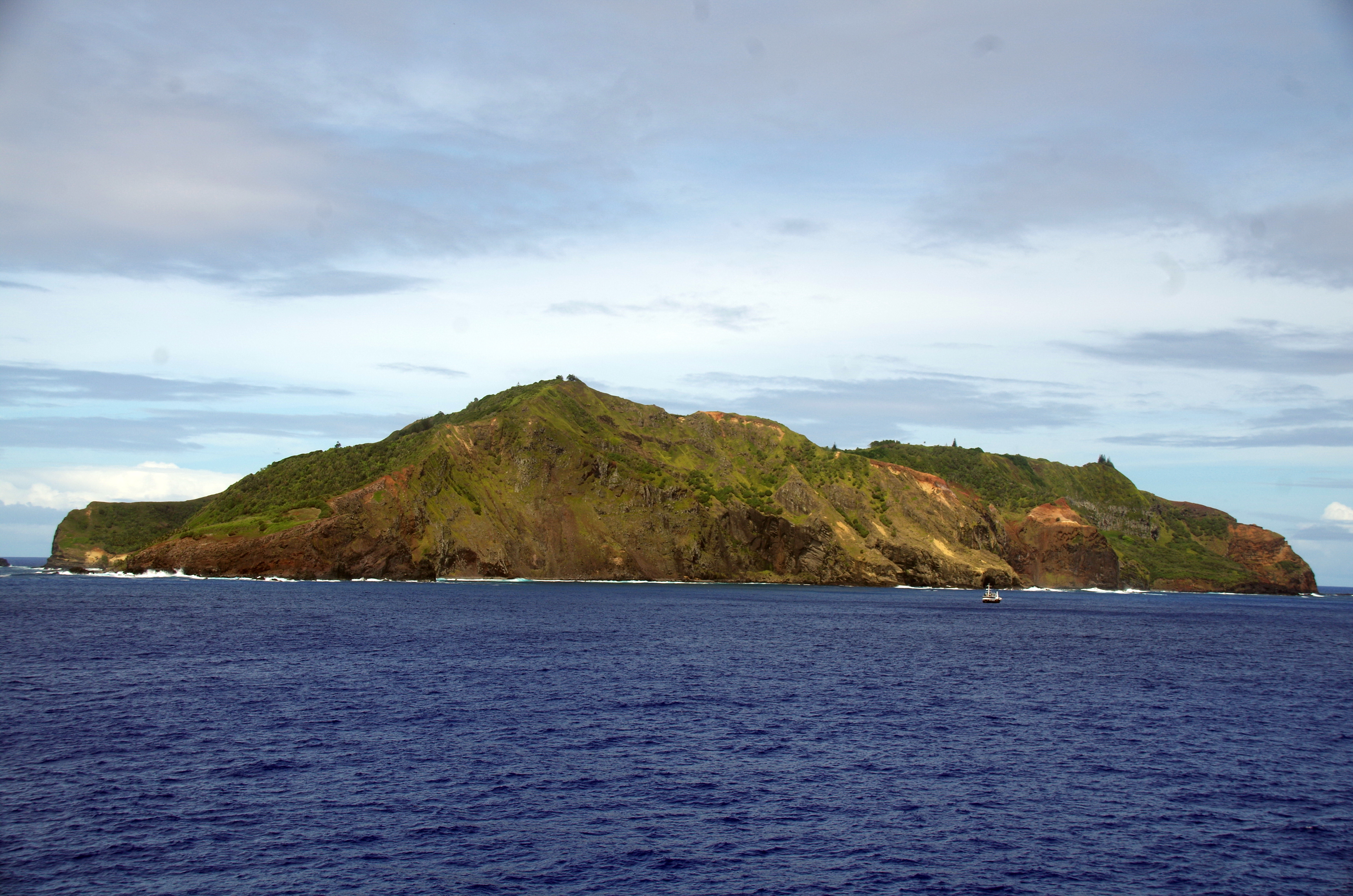

The COVID-19 pandemic in the Pitcairn Islands - a British overseas territory - was part of the worldwide pandemic of coronavirus disease 2019 (COVID-19) caused by severe acute respiratory syndrome coronavirus 2 (SARS-CoV-2). The virus was confirmed to have reached the islands on 16 July 2022.

== Background ==
The Pitcairn Islands are a remote island chain in the Pacific consisting of the islands Pitcairn, Henderson, Ducie, and Oeno. They are the only British Overseas Territory in the Pacific. Only the first island is inhabited, and it has approximately 35 inhabitants (2023).

On 12 January 2020, the World Health Organization (WHO) confirmed that a novel coronavirus was the cause of a respiratory illness in a cluster of people in Wuhan City, Hubei Province, China, which was reported to the WHO on 31 December 2019.

The case fatality ratio for COVID-19 has been much lower than SARS of 2003, but the transmission has been significantly greater, with a significant total death toll.

== Timeline ==
=== 2020 ===
As a precautionary measure, the Pitcairn Islands Government closed the territory's borders. As a result, all passenger services to the island were suspended in mid-March 2020.

=== 2021 ===
The territory's entire population was vaccinated in May 2021, with vaccines that arrived by ship from New Zealand. As of 28 February 2022, 106 vaccines had been administered.

=== 2022 ===
In March 2022, the Pitcairn Islands reopened its border to international travel. Regular shipping with French Polynesia resumed on 5 July 2022.

In July 2022, the Pitcairn Islands reported its first cases after two returning residents tested positive on arrival. Two close contacts were also infected. No hospitalisations were required, and no deaths were recorded.

=== 2023 ===
In April 2023, following visits from multiple cruise ships and yachts, a second COVID-19 outbreak was confirmed on the island. Following identification of an initial case and voluntary community testing, approximately half of the island’s population tested positive, with 16 confirmed cases.

=== 2024 ===
As of June 2024, Pitcairn was one of the only jurisdictions in the world not to have recorded a hospitalisation or death related to COVID-19.

== See also ==
- COVID-19 pandemic in Oceania
