= COVID-19 pandemic in Montserrat =

Ongoing COVID-19 viral pandemic in Montserrat

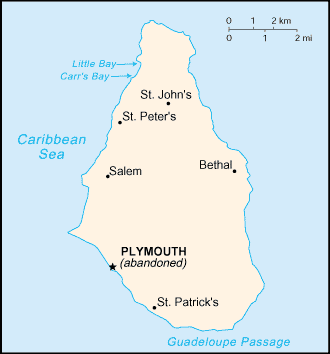
- Disease: COVID-19
- Pathogen: SARS-CoV-2
- Location: Montserrat
- Arrival date: 18 March 2020 (6 years, 5 months and 3 days)
- Confirmed cases: 1,531
- Active cases: 76
- Recovered: 1,449
- Deaths: 6

Government website
- COVID-19 page at gov.ms

The COVID-19 pandemic in Montserrat was a part of the ongoing global viral pandemic of coronavirus disease 2019 (COVID-19), which was confirmed to have reached the British Overseas Territory of Montserrat on 17 March 2020. The first death occurred on 24 April 2020. By 15 May, all patients had recovered. On 10 July, a new case was discovered. On 7 August, there were no more active cases.

== Background ==
On 12 January, the World Health Organization (WHO) confirmed that a novel coronavirus was the cause of a respiratory illness in a cluster of people in Wuhan City, Hubei Province, China, who had initially come to the attention of the WHO on 31 December 2019.

Unlike SARS of 2003, the case fatality ratio for COVID-19 has been much lower, but the transmission has been significantly greater, with a significant total death toll.

The island had a population of 4,649 people in 2018, and of that population there were 1,023 infections accompanied by 8 COVID-19 mortalities since the pandemic started. Testing for COVID-19 was being performed by the Caribbean Public Health Agency. Until13 May when the island received their own testing machine. There is one small hospital (Glendon Hospital) which has no ICU capacity. Specialised health care has to be performed on Antigua or Guadeloupe.

== Timeline ==
Cases

Deaths

=== March 2020 ===
On 18 March, the first case in Montserrat was confirmed. The patient had travelled from London to Antigua before arriving in Montserrat. On the 13 March the authorities had notified that a COVID-19 patient had been discovered on that flight and subsequently all passengers were quarantined and tested.

On 23 March, the second case was confirmed. The patient had no travel history and was the first case of community spread.

On 26 March, three more cases were confirmed to be positive bringing the total to five cases of COVID-19 on the island of Montserrat.

=== April 2020 ===
On 7 April, the number of cases had increased to eight.

On 24 April, the first death related to COVID-19 on Montserrat, that of a 92-year female, was announced.

On 25 April, Montserrat had been without new infections for its second week.

=== May 2020 ===
On 6 May, Premier Joseph E. Farrell announced that the testing machines for COVID-19 will arrive shortly and that island will soon be able to test.

On 12 May, a business impact assessment was released. COVID-19 caused US$3.6 million in economic disruption.

On 15 May, it was reported that there are no more active cases on Montserrat.

=== July 2020 ===
On 10 July, a new case had been discovered. The person had been on the island since March. Contact tracing is under way.

=== August 2020 ===
On 7 August, the last two cases recovered, and the island once again has no more active cases.

=== February 2021 ===
The island began its vaccination campaign on 8 February 2021; by 11 May, there were 1,321 people in Montserrat (28.4%) who had received at least one dose of the vaccine and 976 (21.0%) had received their second dose.

=== October 2022 ===
End of measures.

== Preventive measures ==
- 24 February: Travel restriction for China (including Hong Kong, Macau, and Taiwan), Japan, Malaysia, Singapore, Republic of Korea, Thailand, and Iran.
- 26 February: Travel restriction extended to Northern Italy.
- 14 March: Schools are closed and gatherings over 50 people are prohibited. Visits of hospitals and senior citizens' homes are prohibited.
- 21 March: Gatherings over 25 are prohibited. Mandatory 14 day quarantine for travellers.
- 25 March: Gatherings over 4 are prohibited. Curfew instituted between 19:00 and 05:00. Non-essential travel is prohibited. Non-residents are banned from entering by plane or ship.
- 28 March: 24 hour curfew from 28 March until 14 April.
- 9 April: 7 day complete shutdown came into effect and the curfew was extended to 30 April. On 11 and 12 April, people were allowed to shop for essential goods in four groups based on their last name.
- 17 April: Shutdown extended to 1 May. Between 20 and 22 April people will be allowed to shop for essential goods based on their last name.
- 29 April: Limited opening for essential business from 1 May until 7 May. People allowed to leave their house for essential business and limited exercise outside.
- 6 May: People allowed in public on Monday to Friday between 05:00 and 19:00 for essential business. People allowed to engage in an activity alone or with no more than 4 members of the same household between 05:00 and 08:00 and 16:00 to 18:30.
- 22 May: Curfew modified to 20:00 to 05:00, with no weekend lock-down. All retail stores can reopen. Restaurants can reopen as takeaway only. Construction work can resume. Visits to retirement homes are possible for family only. Barbers, churches, buses, and taxis are allowed to reopen with strict conditions. Bars, night clubs, gyms, and schools remain closed.

== Statistics ==
Chronology of the number of active cases

(Note: On 8 May it was reported that the number of active cases is 1, even though the numbers seems to suggest 2.)

== See also ==
- Caribbean Public Health Agency
- COVID-19 pandemic in North America
- COVID-19 pandemic by country and territory
