= COVID-19 pandemic in South Ossetia =

Details of ongoing viral pandemic in South Ossetia

- Disease: COVID-19
- Pathogen: SARS-CoV-2
- Location: South Ossetia (Georgia)
- Index case: Tskhinvali
- Arrival date: 6 May 2020 (6 years, 3 months and 2 days)
- Confirmed cases: 3,296 (as of 23 April 2021)
- Active cases: 333
- Recovered: 2,903
- Deaths: 60 +

The COVID-19 pandemic was confirmed to have reached South Ossetia (Note: South Ossetia's status is disputed. It considers itself to be an independent state, but this is recognised by only a few other countries. The Georgian government and most of the world's other states consider South Ossetia de jure a part of Georgia's territory.) in May 2020.

== Background ==
On 12 January 2020, the World Health Organization (WHO) confirmed that a novel coronavirus was the cause of a respiratory illness in a cluster of people in Wuhan City, Hubei Province, China, which was reported to the WHO on 31 December 2019.

The case fatality ratio for COVID-19 has been much lower than SARS of 2003, but the transmission has been significantly greater, with a significant total death toll.

== Timeline ==
=== March 2020 ===
Many schools and businesses in South Ossetia were closed on 20 March.

=== April 2020 ===
Borders between Russia and Georgia were closed on 5 April.

=== May 2020 ===
The first three cases of COVID-19 in South Ossetia were confirmed on 6 May. One of the cases was a retired man from North Ossetia, who arrived in South Ossetia on 20 April, and has been quarantined in a hospital since then. Another case, from Vladikavkaz, was a 14-year-old student of the Suvorov Military School. The third case also came from Vladikavkaz, but further details are unknown. Contact tracing has been conducted for these cases.

As of 24 May, there were a total of 37 cases in South Ossetia.

=== November 2020 ===
In November, the head of the Consular Agency of South Ossetia in Vladikavkaz delivered medicines to South Ossetia. The South Ossetian president Anatoliy Bibilov had appealed to the Ossetian diasporas and entrepreneurs to provide all possible assistance to the population of South Ossetia.

=== December 2020 ===
In December, the Russian Armed Forces withdrew their mobile hospital they had established in the South Ossetian capital.

=== February 2021 ===
In late February 2021, Politico Europe reported that South Ossetia has allocated the equivalent of $27,000 from its 2021 budget for purchases of the Sputnik V COVID-19 vaccine.

=== June 2021 ===
In June, South Ossetian president Anatoliy Bibilov was vaccinated with the Sputnik vaccine.

== Response ==
South Ossetia is a disputed territory in the South Caucasus, recognized by Russia and a few other countries as an independent state, but regarded by most of international actors as part of Georgia.

Early in the pandemic, senior Georgian government officials called on the WHO and other international organisations to provide support to people living in the two breakaways. They said Georgia would not block movement to and from the regions. Unlike Abkhazia, South Ossetia refused to cooperate with Georgia and blocked movement from or to Tbilisi-controlled territory in February 2020. The South Ossetian authorities refused to admit the specialists from the WHO and other international organisations unless they entered through Russia rather than Georgia although the border with Russia had also been closed in March 2020.

According to the International Crisis Group, of the fellow ex-Soviet breakaways, South Ossetia is at greatest risk due to high percent of elderly population (17%), severely under-equipped medical facilities, lack of properly trained medical professionals, and failure to procure significant aid from Russia, which generally provides a majority of the region's needs.
