= COVID-19 pandemic in Niue =

- Disease: COVID-19
- Pathogen: SARS-CoV-2
- Location: Niue
- First outbreak: Wuhan, China
- Arrival date: 9 March 2022
- Confirmed cases: 1,092
- Deaths: 0
- Fatality rate: 0%
- Vaccinations: 1,635 (fully vaccinated)

The COVID-19 pandemic in Niue was part of the worldwide pandemic of coronavirus disease 2019 (COVID-19) caused by severe acute respiratory syndrome coronavirus 2 (SARS-CoV-2). Niue reported its first confirmed case on 9 March 2022.

== Background ==
On 12 January 2020, the World Health Organization (WHO) confirmed that a novel coronavirus was the cause of a respiratory illness in a cluster of people in Wuhan, Hubei Province, China, which was reported to the WHO on 31 December 2019.

The case fatality ratio for COVID-19 has been much lower than SARS of 2003, but the transmission has been significantly greater, with a significant total death toll.

Niue along with the Cook Islands were formally annexed into the Realm of New Zealand on 11 June 1901. Niue became a self-governing territory in free association with New Zealand on 9 October 1974. As an associated state, Niue remains constitutionally part of the Realm of New Zealand. Niueans also retain New Zealand nationality, open access to New Zealand, and receive budgetary assistance. Niue is also not a member of the United Nations.

== Timeline ==
Cases

Deaths

On 9 March 2022, the country reported its first case of COVID-19 as the result of travel from New Zealand. On 24 March, four new cases were reported at the border as a result of travel from New Zealand. All four cases were asymptomatic and included two children under the age of three years. In response, Premier Dalton Tagelagi moved Niue into Alert Level Yellow, which was the second of the three alert levels for Niue's response to COVID-19. By 30 March, two new cases were reported, bringing the total number of active cases to six. Tegelagi criticised relatives of infected individuals for lingering outside Managed Isolation and Quarantine (MIQ) facilities. He advised them not to chat with patients while dropping off food at MIQ facilities.

On 1 July, five passengers on a flight from New Zealand carrying 118 passengers tested positive for COVID-19. In response, Niuean authorities tested the other passengers and launched contact tracing to identify close contacts of the infected individuals. On 30 July, Niue reported its first four community cases. By that time, the island country had reported 30 COVID-19 cases at the border. Late that day, the number of new cases had risen to nine. Cases continued to rise throughout the year, reaching a total of 184 cases by early December 2022.

Cases continued to rise in 2023 and by June 2023, the total number of cases had reached 820 with all having recovered. By the end of 2023, the island had recorded a total of 933 cases with no deaths.

=== Second outbreak ===
On 4 February 2025, the Niue Health Department reported a total of 71 cases in Niue; with 18 new cases reported in the last 36 hours. 32 of these cases remained active. On 7 February 2025, the Health Department declared a second COVID-19 outbreak, with a total of 99 cases. Head of Public Health Grizelda Mokoia attributed the outbreak to funerals, public gatherings and new cases arriving via plane. This was the second surge since November 2022 when Niue reported 380 COVID-19 cases. The total number of cases reached 132 on 11 February, since the first new cases were reported on 11 January at the start of the year.

== Responses ==
In response to the global COVID-19 pandemic in March 2020, the Niuean government banned visitors from highly affected countries, and later all arrivals except for Niue residents and essential services people only.

Since March 2021, Niue had a one-way travel bubble which allowed Niueans to travel to New Zealand without quarantine. From 24 March 2021, travellers from Niue were allowed to resume quarantine free travel into New Zealand.

Following the island state's first reported case on 8 March 2022, Niue tightened its border restrictions with the goal of eliminating COVID-19. Travellers were required to have a polymerase chain reaction (PCR) test 48 hours before departing from New Zealand to Niue. On 6 April 2022, the Government revised the policy by requiring travellers to Niue to undertake rapid antigen testing before departing for Niue. After nine new cases were reported on 30 July, Niuean authorities moved the country to COVID-19 Alert Code Red but did not implement a lockdown.

All travel restrictions were lifted and the border opened completely on 30 March 2023, three years after first set of restrictions came into effect.

== Vaccination ==
Niue commenced their vaccination campaign the week beginning 31 May 2021.

On 9 July 2021, Niue completed its initial vaccination rollout, which included everyone aged 16 years or older. 97% of the eligible population has been fully vaccinated using the Pfizer Comirnaty vaccine.

As of 1 August 2021, a total of 2,352 vaccine doses have been administered.

== See also ==
- COVID-19 pandemic in Oceania
