= COVID-19 pandemic in Saint Helena, Ascension and Tristan da Cunha =

Ongoing COVID-19 viral pandemic in Saint Helena, Ascension and Tristan da Cunha

- Disease: COVID-19
- Pathogen: SARS-CoV-2
- Location: Saint Helena, Ascension and Tristan da Cunha
- Arrival date: 24 December 2020 (5 years, 4 months, 3 weeks and 3 days)
- Confirmed cases: 42+
- Active cases: 1
- Suspected cases^{‡}: 7
- Recovered: 41+
- Deaths: 0

Government website
- https://www.ascension.gov.ac/government/news https://www.sainthelena.gov.sh/coronavirus-covid-19/communications/ https://www.tristandc.com/government.php

This article lists links to articles relating to the COVID-19 pandemic within Saint Helena, Ascension and Tristan da Cunha.

== Saint Helena ==
On 27 March 2020 the Saint Helena government announced a suspected case of COVID-19 in an individual that had been self-isolating since 21 March. Owing to Saint Helena's remote location, no testing facilities were readily available at that time. The case later tested negative.

On 5 January 2021, the first doses of the Oxford–AstraZeneca COVID-19 vaccine were delivered to Saint Helena and began to be administered.

On 26 March 2021, Health Directorate of Saint Helena reported a low positive case, a passenger arrived by flight on 24 March. The passenger was tested negative on 29 March 2021.

On 27 March 2021, Saint Helena government announced an unspecified number of positive cases on a fishing vessel.

On 5 May 2021, the Government of Saint Helena announced that 3,528 residents had received both doses of the vaccine; this represents 95.1% of Saint Helena's adult population and 77.8% of its total population.

On 3 September, an unspecified number of cases are announced on a flight from United Kingdom.

On 18 January 2022, a new unspecified number of positive cases are detected in home quarantine.

On 21 January, 17 March, 1st and 5 April, new unspecified number of positive cases are reported.

On 20 April 2022, an unspecified number of positive cases are confirmed and other case from an individual tested on 9 April.

On 4 May and 11 May, new unspecified number of cases are reported. Other cases are confirmed on individuals in home quarantine tested on 23 April.

On 2 June 2022, the MV Helena confirmed positive cases on board.

On 27 June 2022, new positive cases are confirmed along passengers from flight arrived on 19 June.

On 5th and 29 July, new unspecified number of positive cases are detected.

On 23 September 2022, 1,355 positive cases are reported.

== Ascension ==
On 16 March 2020, three people who arrived by air to Ascension Island showed symptoms of COVID-19. However, on 23 March it was announced that they had tested negative on 22 March.

On 7 September 2020, the Ascension Island Government announced two weak positives cases on two peoples arrived on 4 September with a negative test result. The two cases were tested negative and confirmed as historical infection on 9 September.

On 16 November 2020, the Ascension Island Government reported one other weak positive case, subsequently tested negative on 18 November.

On 24 December 2020, the Ascension Island Government announced a positive case in isolation. The case was tested negative on 6 January 2021.

On 16 February 2021, 1950 doses of the Oxford-AstraZeneca vaccine were delivered by the Royal Air Force; vaccinations began the next day. By March 25, 798 of Ascension's 806 people (99%) had received at least one dose of the vaccine.

On 16 April 2021, a new positive case is reported on an individual arrived on 14 April and mildly symptomatic. On 26 April, the case is confirmed to be negative.

On 15 July 2021, a mildly symptomatic case is reported. The case is tested negative on 26 July.

3 individuals are tested positive on 9 August 2021, and subsequently tested negative on 23 August.

On 6 January 2022, two positive cases are detected. A new positive case is reported on 19 January.

On 8 February 2022, a new positive case is confirmed.

On 10 March, a new positive case is reported in compulsory isolation. An other case is confirmed on 18 March.

On 4 April 2022, an individual arrived by flight from United Kingdom is confirmed positive.

On 4 May 2022, two individuals arrived by boat from Canada were tested positive.

On 18 May, two individuals arrived by flight on 12 May, previously tested negative, are tested positive.

On 24 June 2022, three new positive cases are reported.

On 29 June 2022, a new positive case is confirmed.

Ascension Island removed all quarantine requirement for travelers on 31 July 2022.

On 9 August 2022, Ascension Island government confirmed the first community case.

As of 9 August 2022, Ascension Island government reported 24 positive cases and 2 historical.

Since 8 August 2022, 170 positive cases are reported.

== Tristan da Cunha ==
On 16 March 2020, the Tristan da Cunha Island Council on Tristan da Cunha made the decision, as a precaution, to ban visitors to the island to prevent the potential transmission of the disease to islanders.

On 21 April 2021, HMS Forth delivered enough Oxford-AstraZeneca vaccine for the whole island to be completely vaccinated. Vaccinations began on April 28 though data has not yet been released on the percentage of people that have received them.

As of 27 April 2021, there had been no reported cases of the coronavirus.

On 19 July 2021, two positive cases are detected on board of the MFV Edinburgh before disembarkation. Edinburgh of the Seven Seas subsequently entered into lockdown for 10 days.
