= COVID-19 pandemic in the British Indian Ocean Territory =

Aspect of the pandemic

- Disease: COVID-19
- Pathogen: SARS-CoV-2
- Location: British Indian Ocean Territory
- First outbreak: Wuhan, Hubei, China
- Arrival date: November 2020
- Confirmed cases: 5
- Suspected cases: 0
- Recovered: 2
- Deaths: 0

The COVID-19 pandemic in the British Indian Ocean Territory is part of the ongoing worldwide pandemic of coronavirus disease 2019 (COVID-19) caused by severe acute respiratory syndrome coronavirus 2 (SARS-CoV-2). The virus was confirmed to have reached Diego Garcia of the British Indian Ocean Territory in November 2020.

== Background ==
On 12 January 2020, the World Health Organization (WHO) confirmed that a novel coronavirus was the cause of a respiratory illness in a cluster of people in Wuhan City, Hubei Province, China, which was reported to the WHO on 31 December 2019.

The case fatality ratio for COVID-19 has been much lower than SARS of 2003, but the transmission has been significantly greater, with a significant total death toll. From 19 March 2020, Public Health England no longer classified COVID-19 as a "High consequence infectious disease".

== Timeline ==
In November 2020, the first case of COVID-19 was confirmed at Diego Garcia. A month later in December, the second case, a close contact of the first case, was confirmed. In May 2021, three more cases were confirmed from a flight. The personnel arrived at the island in April.

== Impact ==
Though the British Indian Ocean Territory did not have a permanent population at the time of the pandemic, the Chagos Islanders whom used to live there were subject to COVID-19 restrictions. An appeal for a £40 million fund set up by the British government to assist Chagos Islanders to be used for COVID-19 support, was mostly not agreed to.

Despite the low numbers of cases, enforcement by the British authorities against illegal fishing in the Chagos Marine Protected Area was hampered by COVID-19 protocols. This was because they prevented British Indian Ocean Territory personnel from boarding suspect vessels.
