= COVID-19 pandemic in Akrotiri and Dhekelia =

- Disease: COVID-19
- Pathogen: SARS-CoV-2
- Location: Akrotiri and Dhekelia
- Arrival date: 15 March 2020 (6 years, 2 months and 2 days)
- Confirmed cases: 11
- Recovered: 0
- Deaths: 0

The COVID-19 pandemic was confirmed to have reached the British Overseas Territory of Akrotiri and Dhekelia in March 2020.

== Background ==
On 12 January 2020, the World Health Organization (WHO) confirmed that a novel coronavirus was the cause of a respiratory illness in a cluster of people in Wuhan City, Hubei Province, China, which was reported to the WHO on 31 December 2019.

The case fatality ratio for COVID-19 has been much lower than SARS of 2003, but the transmission has been significantly greater, with a significant total death toll. From 19 March, Public Health England no longer classified COVID-19 as a "High consequence infectious disease".

== Timeline ==
=== March 2020 ===
On 13 March, Cyprus implemented a 14-day self-isolation rule for all people travelling from the United Kingdom. This measure included arrivals from the United Kingdom travelling to the Sovereign Bases of Akrotiri and Dhekelia. Several people were self-isolating within the bases and being tested. All sporting activities, visits, and non-essential exercises within the bases were cancelled, in an effort to reduce the number of outside visitors.

On 15 March, the first two cases in Akrotiri and Dhekelia were confirmed, both members of the UK Armed Forces permanently based at RAF Akrotiri. They arrived at Paphos Airport on 13 March. They self-isolated and were tested positive after developing mild symptoms. Immediately after, the BFC Joint Services Health Unit started contact tracing.

On 18 March, a third case was confirmed.

=== April 2020 ===
On that same day, the bases announced that all six schools in Akrotiri and Dhekelia would be closed until 20 April.
