= COVID-19 pandemic death rates by country =

This article contains the number of confirmed COVID-19 deaths per population as of 18 September 2026, by country. It also has cumulative death totals by country. For these numbers over time see the tables, graphs, and maps at COVID-19 pandemic deaths and COVID-19 pandemic by country and territory.

This data reflects entire populations and does not adjust for age-specific risk. According to U.S. CDC data, COVID-19 has had markedly different impacts across demographics, with factors such as pre-existing conditions, socioeconomic status, and urban versus rural residency influencing outcomes. For example, the CDC reported that as 27 April 2021, the reported case fatality ratios were 0.015%, 0.15%, 2.3%, and 17% for the age groups 0–17, 18–49, 50–74, and 75 or over, respectively. Similar patterns were observed in other countries, with older populations consistently experiencing higher mortality, emphasizing the critical role of age distribution in pandemic modeling.

== Data reliability ==
Variation between testing programmes worldwide results in different ascertainment rates per country: not every SARS-CoV-2 infection, nor every COVID-19-related death, will be identified. Additionally, testing availability, public compliance with testing, and differences in healthcare infrastructure further complicate accurate reporting. Some deaths may be wrongly attributed to COVID-19 (for example if all suspected COVID-19 deaths are counted as COVID-19 deaths, for example, Belgium counted suspected deaths as confirmed cases in September 2020, and Public Health England initially counted all deaths after a positive test "to be sure not to underestimate the number of COVID-19 related deaths", while Scotland reported all deaths within 28 days of such a positive test). Therefore, according to WHO analyses, the true numbers of infections and deaths are expected to exceed the confirmed numbers everywhere, though the extent will vary by country. These statistics are therefore less suitable for between-country comparisons. As deaths are easier to identify than infections (which are regularly asymptomatic), the true case fatality rate (CFR) is likely lower than the observed CFR. Underreporting is especially severe in countries with limited healthcare access or conflict zones, where both testing and vital registration systems are incomplete.

Reports from Socialstyrelsen in Sweden indicate 20,797 cases of Covid-19 deaths as of 2024-10-15 which differs from the table below.

Causes of variation in true CFRs between countries, include variations in age and overall health of the population, medical care, and classification of deaths. For instance, countries with higher prevalence of comorbidities such as diabetes, obesity, or cardiovascular disease often experienced elevated mortality rates even among younger age groups.

Excess mortality provides a broader estimate of these numbers. According to WHO, it includes both "direct COVID-19 and indirect, non-COVID-19 deaths". They compare overall mortality with that of previous years, and as such also include the potentially vast number of deaths among people with unconfirmed COVID-19. These statistics have been crucial for understanding the broader societal impact of the pandemic, including deaths due to delayed healthcare, mental health crises, and economic stressors.

== Examples from specific countries ==
=== Russia ===
COVID cases in Russia

According to excess-mortality analyses, Russia's total COVID-19 deaths in 2020 were estimated to exceed 186,000 while confirmed COVID-19 deaths were at 56,271. This discrepancy reflects not only under-testing but also policy-driven reporting choices and limited transparency in regional reporting systems.

=== The Netherlands ===
COVID in the Netherlands

In the Netherlands, excess-mortality estimates indicate around 20,000 deaths from COVID-19 in 2020, while only the death of 11,525 identified COVID-19 cases was registered. The official count of COVID-19 deaths as of December 2021 is slightly more than 5.4 million, according to World Health Organization's report in May 2022. WHO also said that the real numbers are far higher than the official tally because of unregistered deaths in countries without adequate reporting. WHO emphasized that undercounting remains a global issue, particularly in low and middle-income countries where civil registration and death certification are incomplete.

COVID cases in China

=== China ===
The number of reported deaths and cases in China is likely severely undercounted. Multiple independent studies estimate China's true COVID-19 death toll may be between one to two million, rather than the official count of 122,398. This is partly due to how deaths caused by COVID-19 are counted. Only deaths occurring in hospitals are included. Furthermore, regional disparities in reporting and sudden changes in testing strategy contributed to challenges in determining the actual mortality burden.

== Age and gender adjusted mortality ==
COVID‑19 mortality varies substantially by age, with older populations experiencing disproportionately higher fatality rates. According to provisional CDC mortality data, COVID‑19 death rates per 100,000 population rise steeply with age, from under 1 in young children to over 1,395 per 100,000 in those aged 85+ in 2021. CDC data also indicates that men experienced higher mortality rates, with 208,718 men passing in 2020 and 175,818 females passing. This number spiked to 258,507 and 202,006 in 2021. Biological, behavioral, and occupational factors may contribute to these differences, including a higher prevalence of comorbidities among men and differntial exposure risk.

According to one comparative study of European countries, "once differences in population age distributions are taken into account, variations in mortality rates between countries are considerably smaller", and highlighted the importance of age-standardized mortality for international comparisons. Age-standardized mortality is critical for assessing international comparisons accurately.These metrics allow policymakers and researchers to distinguish the impact of the disease itself from demographic factors that influence observed death rates.

== Timeline of reporting changes and policy shifts ==
Throughout the pandemic, many countries revised their case and death reporting systems. Public Health England changed its definition, counting deaths within 28 days of a positive test, noting: "death in a person with a laboratory-confirmed positive COVID-19 test and died within (equal to or less than) 28 days of the first positive specimen date." A technical review later noted that "the UK daily COVID death counts … were changed to report deaths within 28 days of a first [positive test]." At the global level, the World Health Organization noted changes in international reporting frequency beginning in 2023. As the organization stated, "a number of countries have stopped reporting or changed their frequency … As of 25 August 2023, WHO declared that it is no longer necessary … to report daily counts." WHO further cautioned that "case detection, definitions, testing strategies, reporting practice, and lag times … differ between countries. This variability makes longitudinal analyses challenging and requires careful interpretation of trends over time. Countries also introduced retroactive adjustments, further complicating historical data comparisons.

== Table of total cases, deaths, and death rates by country ==
Note: Table is automatically updated daily. (Note: The table this note applies to is updated daily by a bot. For more info see Template:COVID-19 data/cite.) Data source is Our World in Data. (Note: Our World in Data (OWID). See Coronavirus Source Data for OWID sourcing info. Excerpt: "Deaths and cases: our data source. Our World in Data relies on data from Johns Hopkins University. ... JHU updates its data multiple times each day. This data is sourced from governments, national and subnational agencies across the world — a full list of data sources for each country is published on Johns Hopkins GitHub site. It also makes its data publicly available there.") (Note: "CSSEGISandData/COVID-19". GitHub. 5 August 2022. COVID-19 Data Repository by the Center for Systems Science and Engineering (CSSE) at Johns Hopkins University. The CSV files are downloaded via the "Raw" links. The "Raw" link doesn't show up until you click the csv file link. This opens into a GitHub page with the data and the "Raw" link. See How to Use our Data for more info and links. See: Pandemic Data Initiative. See more sourcing history and info.)

Updated September 18, 2026.

COVID-19 pandemic cases and mortality by country
Country	Deaths / million	Deaths	Cases
World (Note: Countries which do not report data for a column are not included in that column's world total.)	894	7,115,706	779,277,425
Peru	6,604	221,072	4,533,862
Bulgaria	5,681	38,778	1,341,082
North Macedonia	5,429	9,991	352,093
Bosnia and Herzegovina	5,123	16,419	404,289
Hungary	5,072	49,124	2,240,901
Croatia	4,813	18,806	1,371,705
Slovenia	4,686	9,914	1,366,935
Georgia	4,519	17,151	1,864,337
Montenegro	4,317	2,654	251,280
Czech Republic	4,122	43,995	4,887,686
Latvia	4,115	7,741	977,804
Moldova	4,042	12,290	656,467
Slovakia	3,910	21,401	1,889,970
Greece	3,865	40,254	5,868,533
San Marino	3,693	126	25,292
United States	3,627	1,239,049	103,436,829
Romania	3,604	69,096	3,604,142
Lithuania	3,525	9,931	1,448,719
United Kingdom	3,404	232,112	25,122,084
Brazil	3,347	704,066	38,050,567
Italy	3,329	198,523	26,969,918
Chile	3,298	64,497	5,410,536
Martinique	3,159	1,104	230,354
Poland	3,157	121,221	6,843,989
Armenia	3,049	8,785	454,904
Gibraltar	3,002	113	20,550
Belgium	2,949	34,339	4,908,511
Paraguay	2,940	19,880	735,759
Trinidad and Tobago	2,934	4,390	191,496
Argentina	2,881	130,859	10,119,840
Portugal	2,847	29,663	5,671,925
European Union (Note: Data on member states of the European Union are individually listed, but are also summed here for convenience. They are not double-counted in world totals.)	2,832	1,271,086	186,989,386
Sweden	2,813	29,509	2,787,610
Russia	2,777	404,290	24,901,467
Colombia	2,760	142,824	6,405,305
Aruba	2,708	292	44,224
Ukraine	2,678	109,937	5,555,544
Serbia	2,658	18,057	2,568,005
Guadeloupe	2,654	1,021	203,235
France	2,616	168,207	39,061,500
Mexico	2,605	335,153	7,632,101
Estonia	2,549	3,442	619,786
Spain	2,548	121,886	13,980,340
Bermuda	2,547	165	18,860
Guam	2,536	419	52,287
Austria	2,485	22,534	6,083,796
Tunisia	2,427	29,423	1,153,361
French Polynesia	2,318	650	79,451
Saint Lucia	2,293	410	30,254
Uruguay	2,269	7,697	1,043,295
Liechtenstein	2,262	89	21,649
Suriname	2,256	1,406	82,542
Sint Maarten	2,182	92	11,051
Malta	2,139	1,130	125,608
Bahamas	2,135	849	39,127
Barbados	2,100	593	109,275
Germany	2,080	174,979	38,437,953
Finland	2,058	11,466	1,518,795
Grenada	2,035	238	19,693
Ecuador	2,023	36,064	1,082,356
Panama	2,009	8,843	1,045,788
Andorra	1,994	159	48,015
Republic of Ireland	1,914	9,785	1,749,995
Lebanon	1,905	10,947	1,239,904
Kosovo	1,869	3,212	274,279
Bolivia	1,853	22,389	1,212,187
Costa Rica	1,848	9,396	1,242,945
Puerto Rico	1,832	5,938	1,252,713
Hong Kong	1,798	13,466	2,876,106
Montserrat	1,787	8	1,403
Monaco	1,720	67	17,181
Belize	1,708	688	71,511
Denmark	1,696	10,012	3,453,827
British Virgin Islands	1,669	64	7,661
Curaçao	1,645	305	45,883
South Africa	1,644	102,595	4,073,188
Iran	1,640	146,837	7,627,863
Switzerland	1,611	14,170	4,492,191
Guyana	1,596	1,312	75,858
Collectivity of Saint Martin	1,591	46	12,324
Antigua and Barbuda	1,572	146	9,106
Jersey	1,555	161	66,391
Luxembourg	1,530	1,000	401,725
United States Virgin Islands	1,525	132	25,389
Cyprus	1,450	1,364	718,987
Caribbean Netherlands	1,430	41	11,922
Canada	1,424	55,282	4,819,055
Namibia	1,422	4,110	172,557
Israel	1,395	12,707	4,841,703
French Guiana	1,384	413	98,041
Isle of Man	1,378	116	38,008
Seychelles	1,370	172	51,899
Netherlands	1,283	22,986	8,657,644
Jamaica	1,279	3,634	157,694
Albania	1,275	3,608	337,234
Jordan	1,254	14,122	1,746,997
Saint Vincent and the Grenadines	1,214	124	9,674
Eswatini	1,170	1,427	75,356
Turkey	1,164	101,419	17,004,726
Botswana	1,148	2,801	330,699
Guatemala	1,132	20,209	1,256,348
Dominica	1,107	74	16,047
New Caledonia	1,093	314	80,203
Malaysia	1,076	37,351	5,329,836
Palestine	1,075	5,708	703,228
Honduras	1,062	11,114	473,131
Réunion	1,056	921	494,595
Guernsey	1,050	67	35,326
Norway	1,050	5,732	1,552,735
Azerbaijan	1,005	10,353	836,510
Bahrain	1,001	1,536	696,614
Saint Kitts and Nevis	984	46	6,607
Oman	978	4,628	399,449
Australia	963	25,236	11,861,161
Fiji	962	885	69,047
Kazakhstan	951	19,072	1,504,370
Turks and Caicos Islands	893	41	6,937
Libya	891	6,437	507,269
Northern Mariana Islands	889	41	14,985
New Zealand	884	4,538	2,668,236
Anguilla	844	12	3,904
Mauritius	841	1,074	332,300
Cabo Verde	802	417	64,550
Wallis and Futuna	782	9	3,760
Belarus	775	7,118	994,102
Cuba	771	8,530	1,113,838
Sri Lanka	740	16,907	672,812
Taiwan	739	17,672	9,970,937
American Samoa	702	34	8,359
South Korea	693	35,934	34,571,873
El Salvador	673	4,230	202,146
Mongolia	630	2,136	1,011,489
Mayotte	612	187	42,027
Maldives	602	316	186,694
Japan	597	74,694	33,803,572
Philippines	586	66,864	4,173,631
Indonesia	581	162,059	6,830,274
Federated States of Micronesia	579	65	31,765
Iraq	575	25,375	2,465,545
Palau	562	10	6,372
Kuwait	559	2,570	667,290
Faroe Islands	518	28	34,658
Cayman Islands	516	37	31,472
Iceland	489	186	211,318
Thailand	488	35,015	5,527,815
Saint Barthélemy	456	5	5,507
Morocco	436	16,305	1,279,115
Vietnam	433	43,206	11,624,000
Marshall Islands	424	17	16,297
Nepal	404	12,034	1,003,968
Brunei	399	182	350,550
Dominican Republic	390	4,384	661,103
Greenland	374	21	11,971
India	374	533,849	45,056,221
Myanmar	362	19,494	643,401
Singapore	358	2,024	3,006,155
Zimbabwe	357	5,740	266,436
Sao Tome and Principe	353	80	6,771
Saint Pierre and Miquelon	347	2	3,426
Lesotho	310	709	36,140
Saudi Arabia	299	9,646	841,469
Solomon Islands	254	199	25,954
Qatar	238	690	514,524
United Arab Emirates	229	2,349	1,067,030
Egypt	220	24,830	516,023
Venezuela	207	5,856	552,790
Mauritania	204	997	63,891
Zambia	202	4,078	349,892
Afghanistan	197	7,998	235,214
Comoros	193	161	9,109
Kiribati	183	24	5,085
Cambodia	177	3,056	139,326
Bangladesh	174	29,531	2,052,280
Macau	174	121	3,514
Djibouti	166	189	15,690
Algeria	151	6,881	272,440
Kyrgyzstan	147	1,024	88,953
Samoa	144	31	17,057
Gambia	141	372	12,627
Syria	140	3,163	57,423
Cook Islands	135	2	7,375
Malawi	130	2,686	89,168
Gabon	126	307	49,069
Pakistan	125	30,656	1,580,631
Tonga	123	13	16,992
Senegal	111	1,972	89,440
Rwanda	107	1,468	133,274
Kenya	104	5,689	344,162
Sudan	102	5,046	63,993
Equatorial Guinea	101	183	17,130
Timor-Leste	100	138	23,460
Tuvalu	99	1	2,943
Laos	88	671	219,060
China (Note: Does not include special administrative regions (Hong Kong and Macau) or Taiwan.)	85	122,398	99,381,761
Nauru	84	1	5,393
Guinea-Bissau	84	177	9,614
Uganda	76	3,632	172,234
Somalia	76	1,361	27,334
Haiti	74	860	35,009
Cameroon	71	1,974	125,325
Mozambique	68	2,252	233,935
Papua New Guinea	65	670	46,864
Republic of the Congo	64	389	25,234
Ethiopia	60	7,574	501,339
Yemen	56	2,159	11,945
Liberia	54	294	8,090
Angola	54	1,937	107,487
Madagascar	46	1,428	68,853
Vanuatu	44	14	12,019
Ghana	44	1,463	172,843
Nicaragua	36	245	17,238
Togo	35	290	39,564
Guinea	33	468	38,594
Mali	32	743	33,236
Eritrea	30	103	10,189
Uzbekistan	29	1,016	175,158
Ivory Coast	27	835	88,434
Bhutan	26	21	63,027
Central African Republic	22	113	15,493
Burkina Faso	17	400	22,231
Sierra Leone	15	126	7,985
Democratic Republic of the Congo	14	1,474	101,010
Nigeria	14	3,155	267,237
South Sudan	13	147	18,873
Tanzania	13	846	43,655
Niger	12	315	9,591
Tajikistan	12	125	17,786
Benin	11	163	28,036
Chad	10	194	7,702
Burundi	1	15	54,569
Vatican City	0	0	26
Niue	0	0	1,092
Falkland Islands	0	0	1,923
Saint Helena, Ascension and Tristan da Cunha	0	0	2,166
Pitcairn Islands	0	0	4
Tokelau	0	0	80
North Korea	0	0	0
Turkmenistan	0	0	0

== Map of death rates ==
Total confirmed COVID-19 deaths per million people by country: (Note: Our World in Data (OWID) maps and graphs on cases and deaths. Click on the download tab to download the image. The table tab has a table of the exact data by country. The source tab says the data is from the COVID-19 Data Repository by the Center for Systems Science and Engineering (CSSE) at Johns Hopkins University. The image at the source is interactive and provides more detail. For example, for maps run your cursor over the color bar legend to see the countries that apply to that point in the legend. For graphs run your cursor over the graph for more info. See Coronavirus Source Data for more OWID sourcing info.)

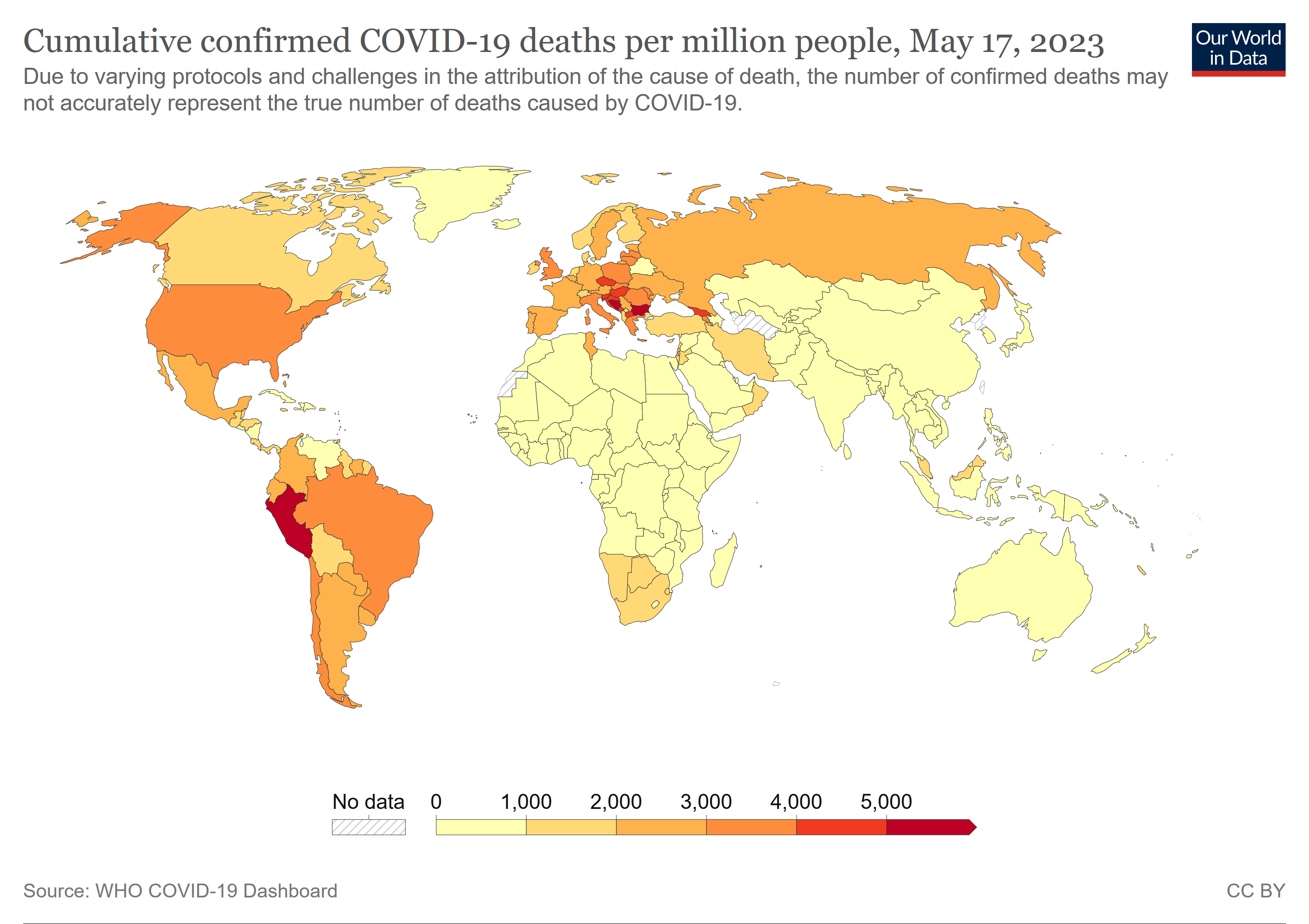
See date at top of map.

Total confirmed COVID cases by country at the start.

== Regional overviews ==
Significant regional disparities in COVID-19 mortality reflect demography, vaccination, surveillance capacity, and timing. According to WHO, as of March 2023, 43% of global reported COVID-19 deaths were in the Americas, followed by 32% in Europe and 12% in South-East Asia.The remaining WHO regions—Western Pacific, Eastern Mediterranean, and Africa—accounted for 14% of global deaths. These variations are influenced by population density, public health infrastructure, vaccine rollout, and pre-existing healthcare inequalities. Additionally, cultural factors, mobility patterns, and government interventions significantly affected the timing and magnitude of mortality waves.

COVID-19 death rates according to vaccination status in the US.

== Comparison with other global health threats ==
The WHO estimates that "COVID-19 was directly responsible for 8.7 million deaths in 2021," making it one of the world's leading causes of death that year. However, it did not exceed major chronic diseases: "The world's biggest killer is ischaemic heart disease, responsible for 13% of the world's total deaths." Lower respiratory infections (non-COVID) remained "the fifth leading cause of death in 2021." COVID-19's mortality risk strongly increases with age. Analysis by Think Global Health notes that while children and adolescents face minimal direct mortality, indirect effects such as missed education, malnutrition, and mental health deterioration add significant long-term health burdens. After adjusting for under-reporting, analyses found COVID-19 ranked among the top three causes of death in several regions, including the second leading cause in the Americas and third in Europe.

The pandemic also produced substantial indirect health impacts. Cardiovascular mortality rose markedly during periods of healthcare disruption, according to the European Heart Journal: "in the early months of the pandemic, studies showed a significant increase in deaths from CVD compared to … 2019," and these elevated levels "persisted until early 2022." Other indirect effects shown included excess mortality due to untreated chronic conditions, reduced vaccination coverage for other infectious diseases, and increased mental health crises. Health systems worldwide experienced strain that exposed vulnerabilities in both high and low-resource settings.

== Summary ==
COVID-19 has demonstrated a highly age-dependent mortality profile, with older populations experiencing disproportionately higher fatality rates. Mortality rates have varied over time due to changes in reporting practices, public health interventions, virus variants, and vaccine rollout. Regional differences reflect disparities in healthcare access, population age structures, and policy responses. Comparison with other global health threats emphasizes COVID-19's significant impact relative to chronic diseases. Age and gender-adjusted mortality analyses provide a clearer understanding of the pandemic's burden across populations, highlighting the importance of protective measures for vulnerable groups. The pandemic underscores the critical role of timely, accurate data reporting and international cooperation in mitigating the effects of emerging diseases. Furthermore, COVID-19 highlighted systemic inequalities and the long-term societal implications of global health crises.

== See also ==
- List of epidemics and pandemics
- List of deaths due to the COVID-19 pandemic – notable individual deaths
- COVID-19 vaccine
- Deployment of COVID-19 vaccines
