= COVID-19 pandemic deaths =

Human mortality as a result of coronavirus disease 2019 (COVID-19)

This article contains the monthly cumulative number of deaths from the pandemic of COVID-19 reported by each country, territory, and subnational area to the World Health Organization (WHO) and published in WHO reports, tables, and spreadsheets. There are also maps and timeline graphs of daily and weekly deaths worldwide. (Note: "CSSEGISandData/COVID-19". GitHub. 7 September 2022. COVID-19 Data Repository by the Center for Systems Science and Engineering (CSSE) at Johns Hopkins University. See How to Use our Data for more info and links. See: Pandemic Data Initiative. See more sourcing history and info.) (Note: Our World in Data (OWID) maps and graphs on cases and deaths. Click on the download tab to download the image. The table tab has a table of the exact data by country. The image at the source is interactive and provides more detail. For example, for maps run your cursor over the color bar legend to see the countries that apply to that point in the legend. For graphs run your cursor over the graph for more info. The sources tab there links to: COVID-19 Data Repository by the Center for Systems Science and Engineering (CSSE) at Johns Hopkins University. See Coronavirus Source Data for more OWID sourcing info.)

7,114,321 (updated 6 June 2026) confirmed COVID-induced deaths have been reported worldwide. As of January 2023, taking into account likely COVID-induced deaths via excess deaths, the 95% confidence interval suggests the pandemic has caused between 19.1 and 36 million deaths.

The latest numbers of cases, deaths, and death rates can be found in COVID-19 pandemic death rates by country. More international statistics, in table, graph, and map forms, are shown in COVID-19 pandemic by country.

The COVID-19 pandemic is the worst worldwide calamity experienced on a large scale (with an estimated 7.1 million confirmed deaths) in the 21st century. The COVID-19 death toll is the highest seen on a global scale since HIV/AIDS, the Spanish flu and World War II.

== Timelines of daily deaths worldwide ==
Graphs below show data from the COVID-19 Data Repository by the Center for Systems Science and Engineering (CSSE) at Johns Hopkins University as rolling seven-day averages.

Graph showing the daily count of new confirmed deaths worldwide

Graph of daily new confirmed deaths worldwide per million people

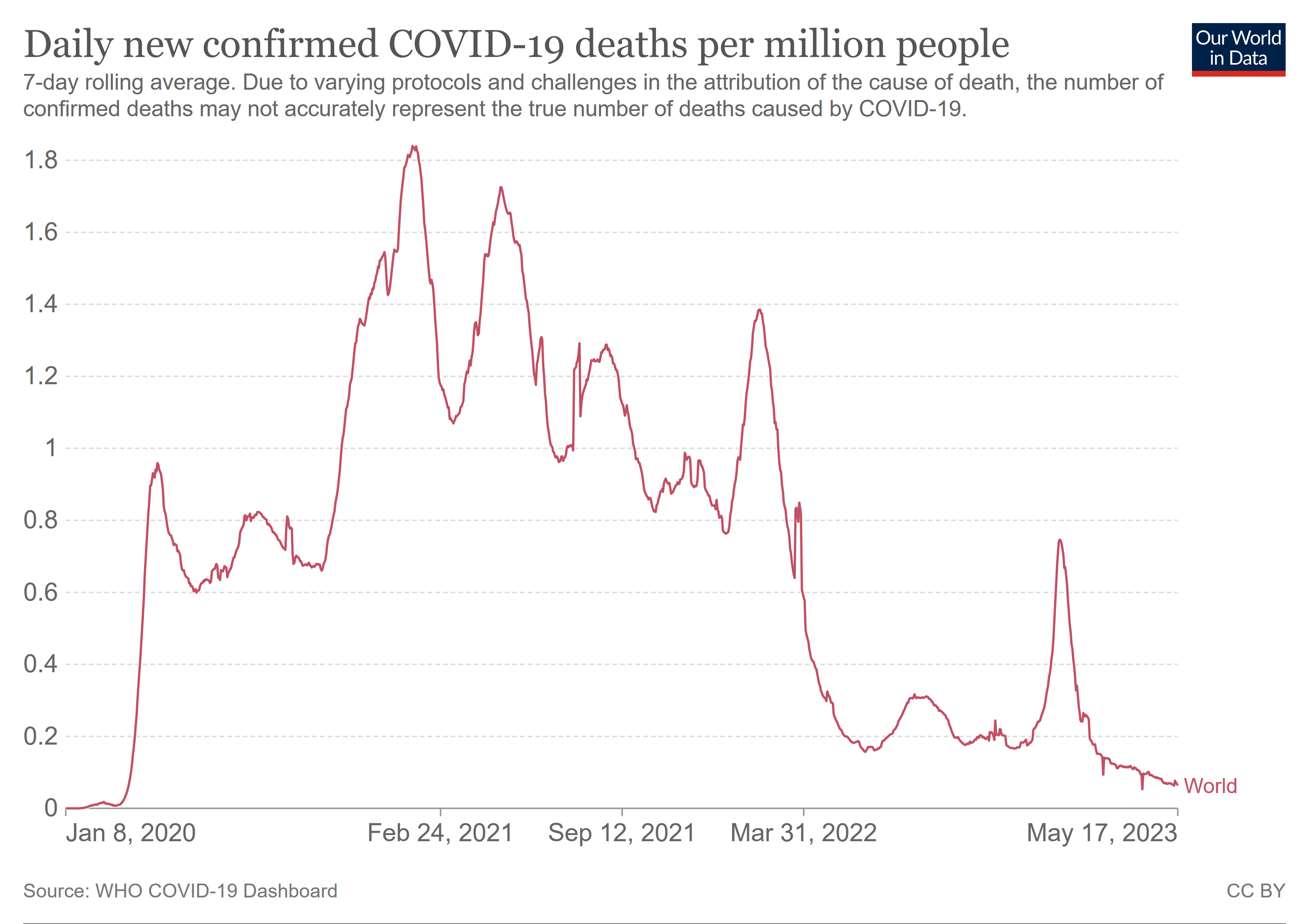

== Timeline of weekly deaths worldwide ==
The graph below shows data from the COVID-19 Data Repository by the Center for Systems Science and Engineering (CSSE) at Johns Hopkins University.

Graph showing the weekly count of new confirmed deaths worldwide

== Maps of deaths by country ==
Data shown in the below images is from the COVID-19 Data Repository by the Center for Systems Science and Engineering (CSSE) at Johns Hopkins University.

Map of total confirmed deaths per million people by country

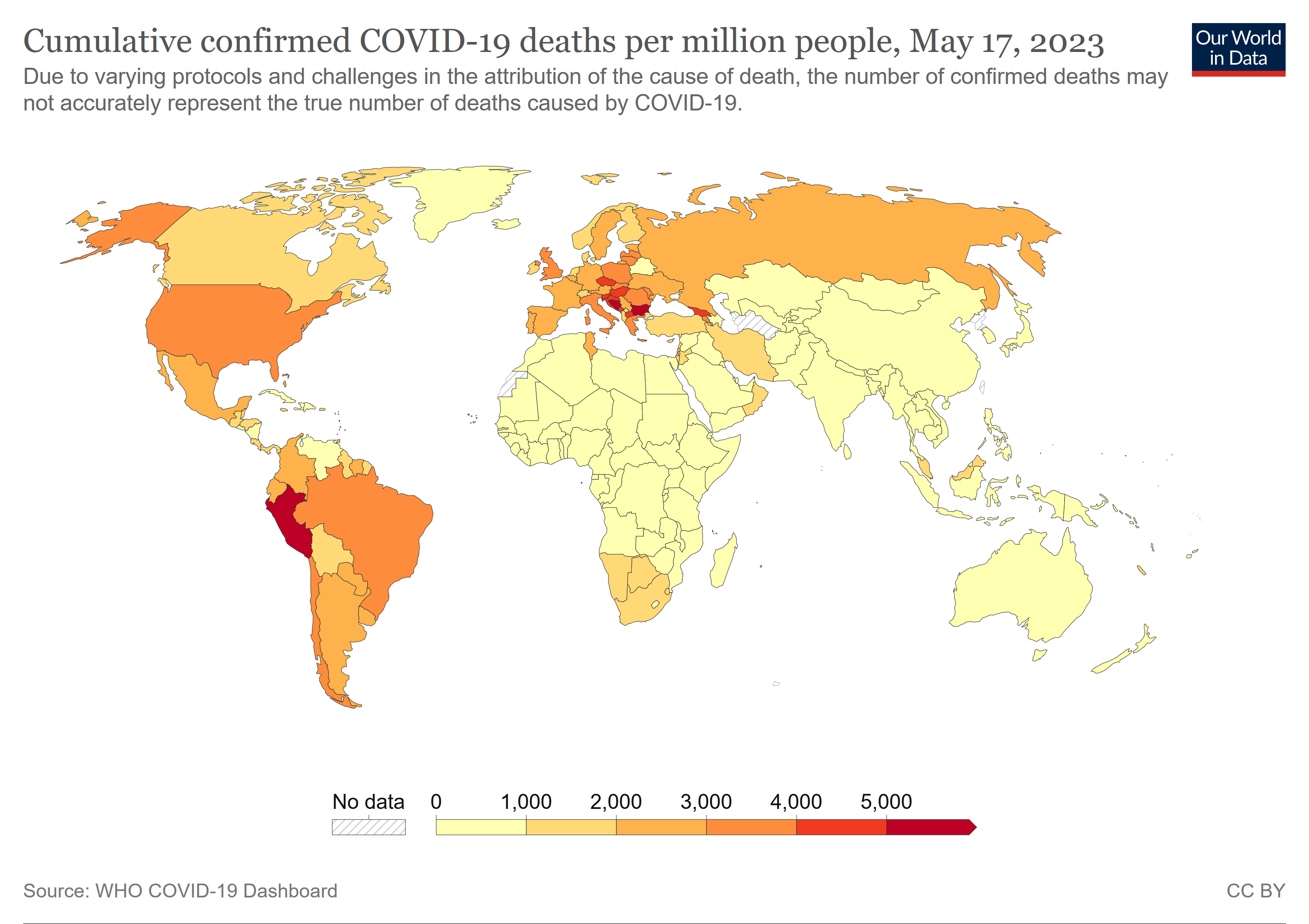

Map of total confirmed deaths by country

== Scientific analysis ==
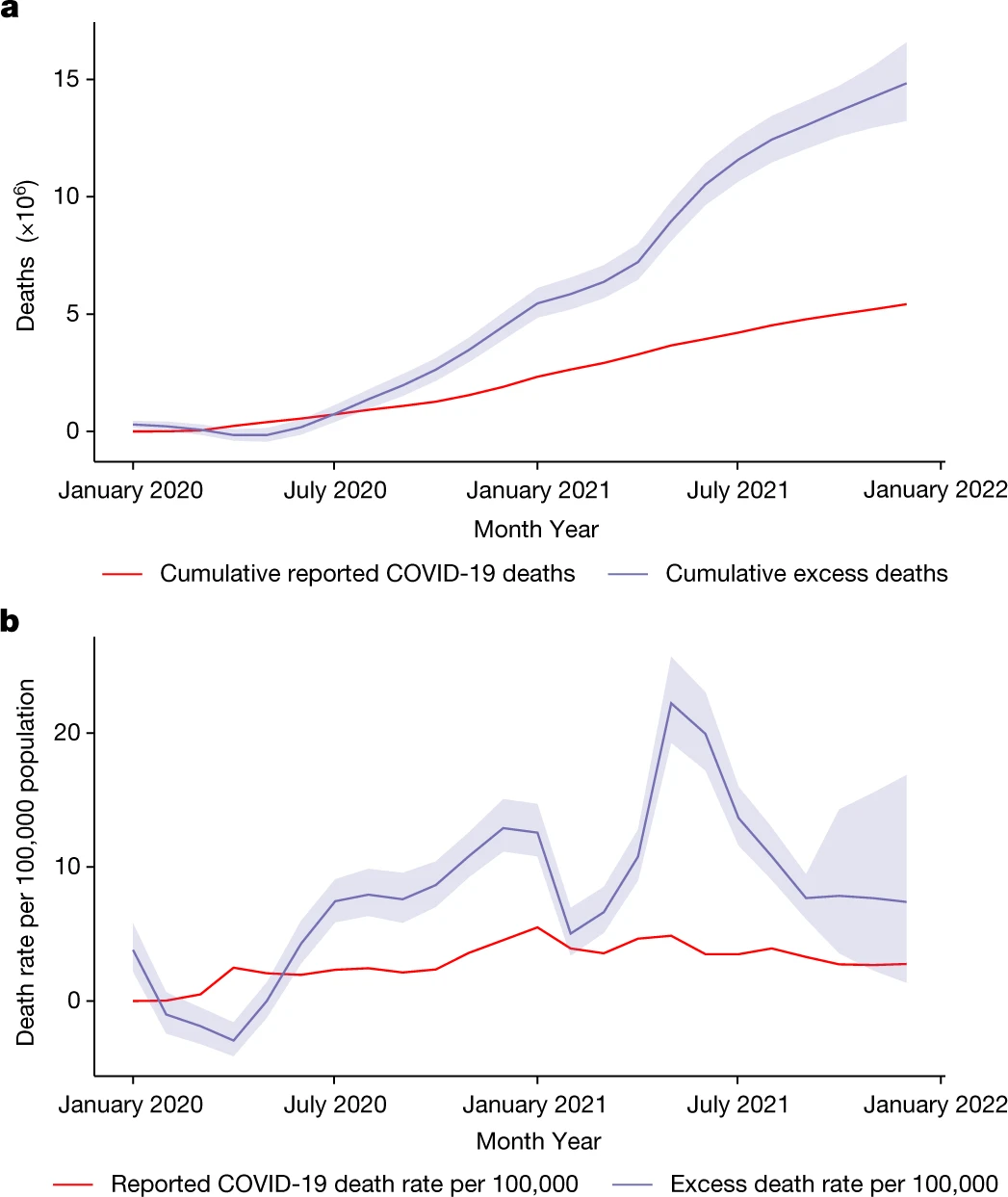
Global excess and reported COVID-19 deaths and death rates per 100,000 population according to the WHO study

A December 2022 WHO study comprehensively estimated excess deaths from the pandemic during 2020 and 2021, concluding ~14.8 million excess early deaths occurred, reaffirming their prior calculations from May as well as updating them, addressing criticisms. These numbers do not include measures like years of potential life lost, far exceeding the 5.42 million officially reported deaths for that timeframe, may make the pandemic 2021's leading cause of death, and are similar to the ~18 million estimated by another study (see below).

In October 2020, a group of scientists, including those from the Imperial College COVID-19 Response Team, published an analysis of the all-cause mortality effect of the first wave of the COVID-19 pandemic for 21 industrialised countries – including its timing, demographics and excess deaths per capita – and assessed determinants for substantial variations in death rates such as the countries' pandemic preparedness and management.

An analysis published in The Lancet in March 2022 by Wang et al. suggests up to 18 million lives may have been lost to the pandemic. Such deaths also include, for example, deaths due to healthcare capacity constraints and priorities, as well as reluctance to seek care (to avoid possible infection). Further research may help distinguish the proportions directly caused by COVID-19 from those caused by indirect consequences of the pandemic.

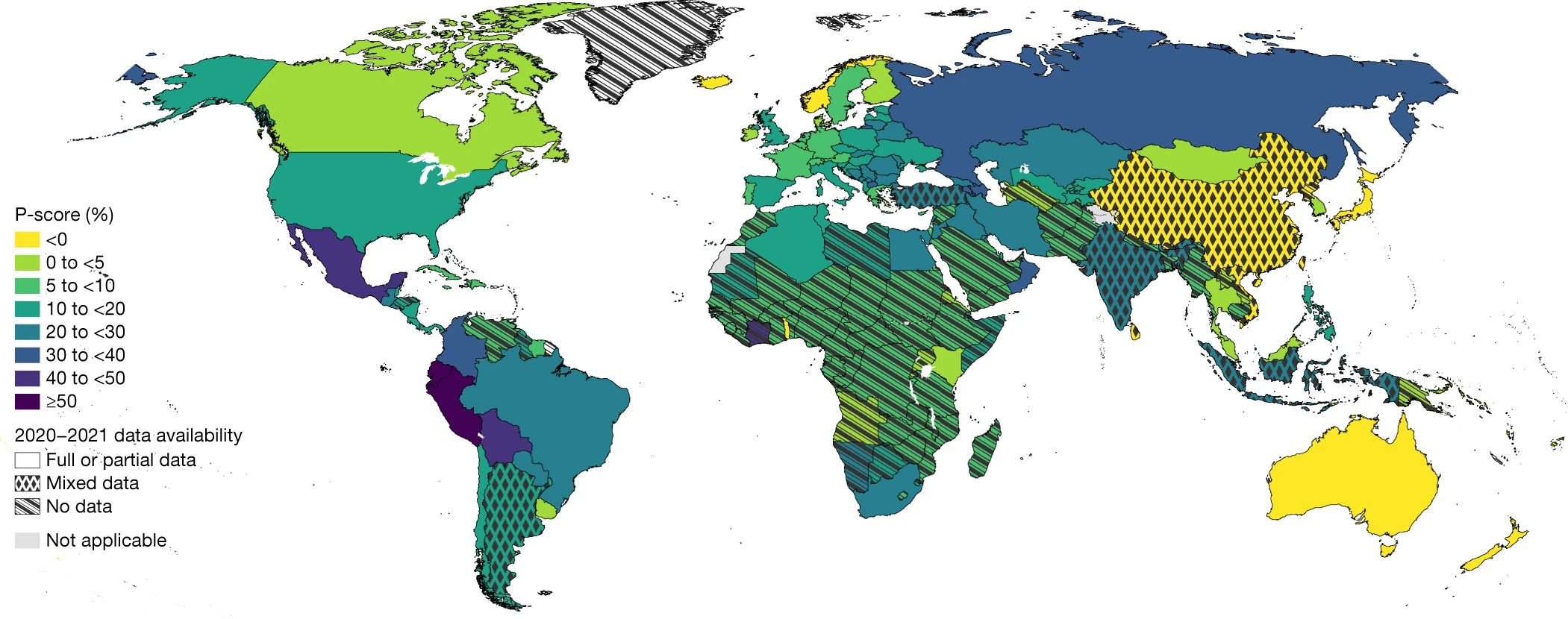
Excess deaths (The patterns indicate the quality of the all-cause mortality data that were available for each country.)

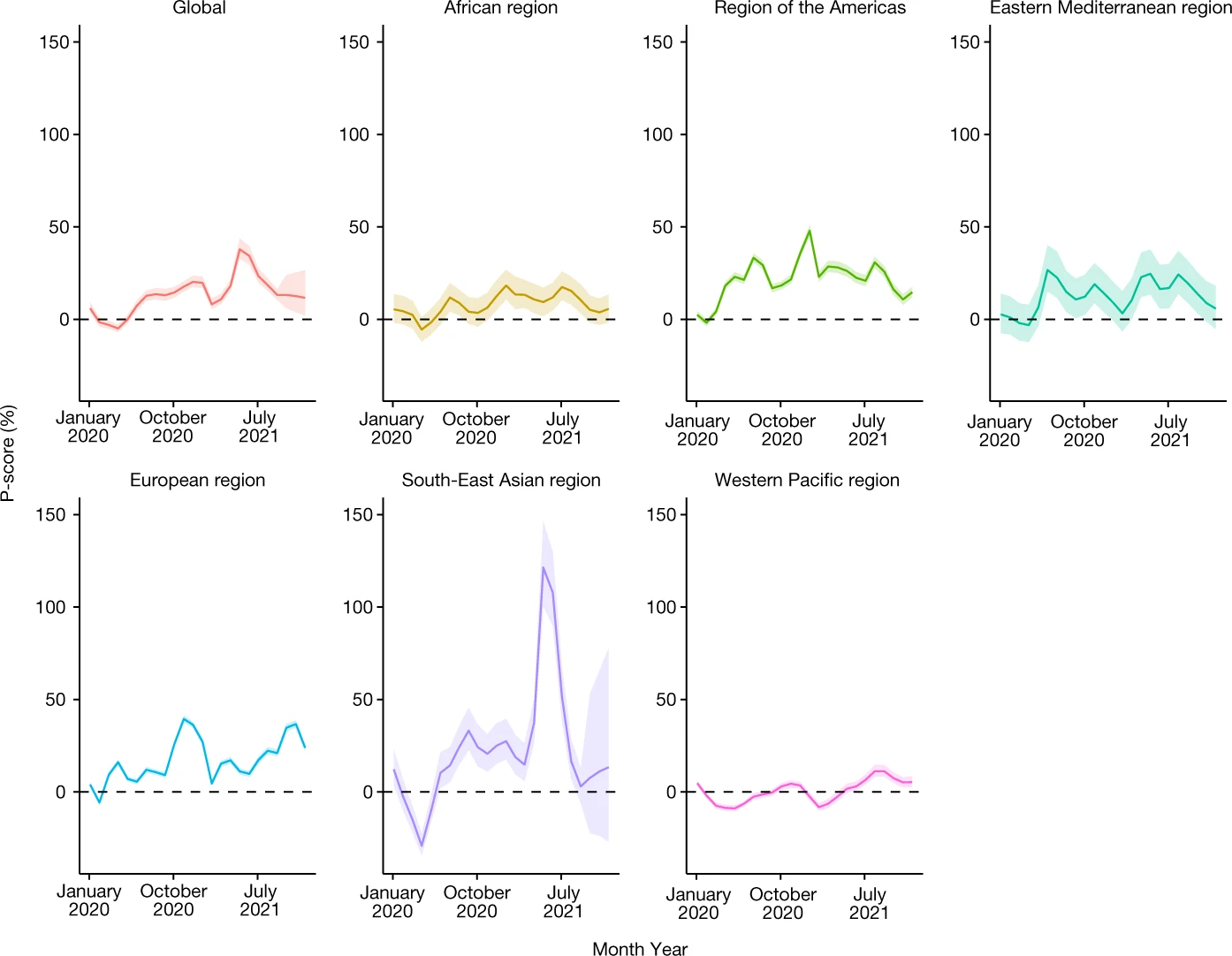
Excess deaths (global and WHO region)

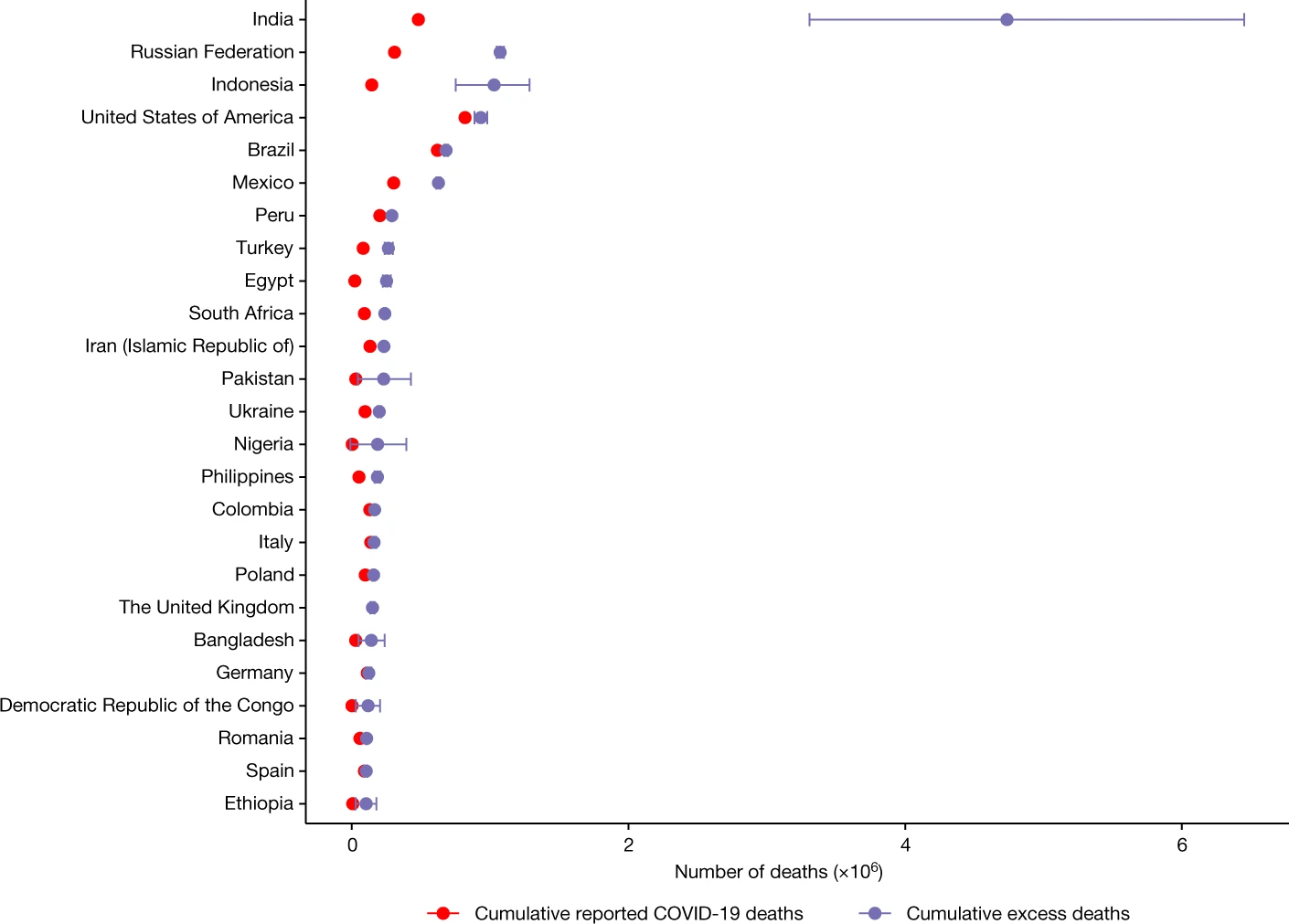
The 25 countries with the highest total estimated COVID-19 pandemic excess deaths between January 2020 and December 2021

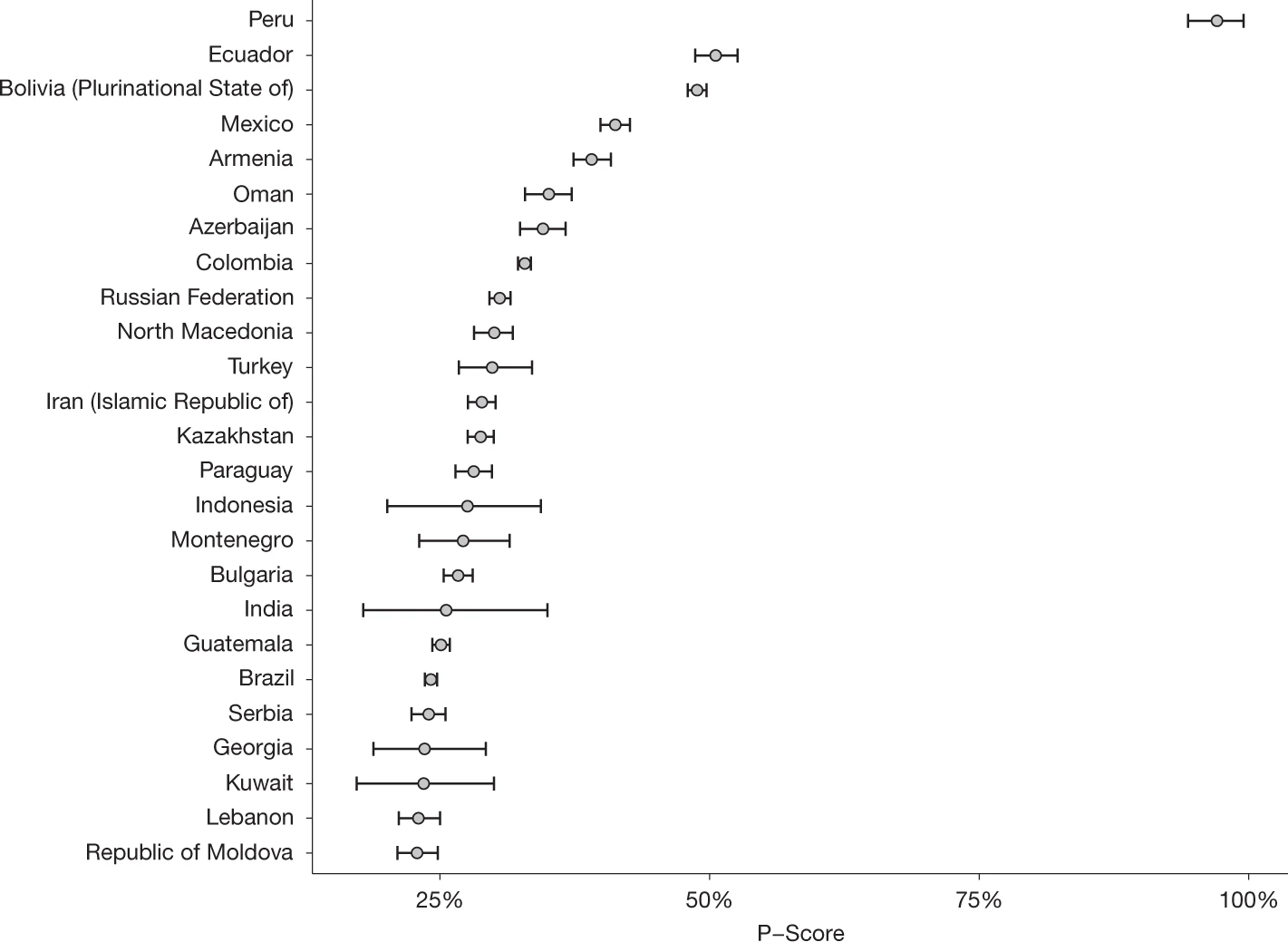
The 25 countries with the highest mean P-scores (excess deaths)

== Cumulative monthly death totals by country ==
=== 2020 ===
2020 cumulative COVID-19 deaths on Jan 12 and first day of remaining months
	Location	Jan	Feb	Mar	Apr	May	Jun	Jul	Aug	Sep	Oct	Nov	Dec
	World	1	259	2,982	44,045	235,789	388,314	535,852	712,811	899,393	1,066,975	1,254,447	1,532,840
	United States	0	0	1	3,155	61,347	104,900	128,182	156,284	186,292	208,253	232,295	271,235
	Brazil	0	0	0	159	5,466	28,834	58,314	91,263	120,828	142,921	159,477	172,833
	India	0	0	0	38	1,147	5,394	17,400	36,511	65,288	98,678	122,111	137,621
	Mexico	0	0	0	28	1,732	9,779	27,121	46,000	64,158	77,163	91,289	105,655
	Peru	0	0	0	113	4,450	20,116	37,512	55,584	73,487	82,236	86,653	89,653
	United Kingdom	0	0	0	2,453	26,683	37,445	40,394	41,189	41,501	42,143	46,555	58,448
	Italy	0	0	29	12,430	27,967	33,415	34,767	35,141	35,483	35,894	38,618	55,576
	France	0	0	2	3,514	24,342	28,746	29,760	30,147	30,494	31,746	36,486	52,371
	Spain	0	0	1	9,490	25,899	29,128	29,763	29,946	31,029	34,157	39,267	48,416
	Iran	0	0	43	3,036	6,028	7,797	10,817	16,766	21,571	26,169	34,864	48,246
	Russia	0	0	0	24	1,169	4,855	9,536	14,058	17,299	20,891	28,235	40,464
	Argentina	0	0	0	24	215	530	1,283	3,466	8,498	16,519	30,792	38,473
	Colombia	0	0	0	14	278	890	3,223	9,810	19,364	25,828	31,135	36,584
	South Africa	0	0	0	5	103	683	2,657	8,005	14,149	16,734	19,276	21,535
	Poland	0	0	0	33	644	1,064	1,463	1,716	2,039	2,513	5,631	17,150
	Indonesia	0	0	0	157	800	1,641	2,934	5,193	7,505	10,856	13,943	17,081
	Belgium	0	0	0	1,384	7,869	9,380	9,646	9,723	9,914	10,046	11,899	16,953
	Germany	0	0	0	732	6,481	8,511	8,985	9,141	9,302	9,500	10,481	16,636
	Chile	0	0	0	12	227	1,054	5,688	9,457	11,289	12,741	14,207	15,410
	Turkey	0	0	0	214	3,174	4,540	5,131	5,691	6,370	8,195	10,252	13,746
	Ecuador	0	0	0	8	900	3,358	4,527	5,702	6,556	11,355	12,670	13,461
	Ukraine	0	0	0	17	272	718	1,173	1,709	2,605	4,193	7,306	12,548
	Iraq	0	0	0	50	93	205	1,943	4,741	7,042	9,181	10,910	12,258
	Canada	0	0	0	89	3,082	7,092	8,566	8,929	9,117	9,291	10,110	12,032
	Romania	0	0	0	92	744	1,276	1,667	2,379	3,681	4,862	7,067	11,530
	Netherlands	0	0	0	1,018	4,765	5,923	6,086	6,145	6,220	6,407	7,398	9,362
	Bolivia	0	0	0	6	59	310	1,071	2,894	4,966	7,931	8,715	8,952
	Czech Republic	0	0	0	35	242	318	347	382	427	675	3,604	8,607
	Philippines	0	0	1	88	568	957	1,266	2,023	3,558	5,504	7,221	8,392
	Pakistan	0	0	0	26	385	1,543	4,395	5,970	6,298	6,484	6,806	8,025
	Sweden	0	0	0	284	2,837	4,615	5,495	5,759	5,829	5,880	6,022	7,198
	Bangladesh	0	0	0	6	170	672	1,888	3,132	4,316	5,272	5,941	6,675
	Egypt	0	0	0	46	392	959	2,953	4,805	5,421	5,930	6,266	6,650
	Saudi Arabia	0	0	0	16	162	503	1,649	2,866	3,897	4,768	5,402	5,896
	Morocco	0	0	0	36	170	205	228	353	1,141	2,194	3,695	5,846
	Hungary	0	0	0	20	323	526	585	596	615	781	1,819	4,977
	Switzerland	0	0	0	482	1,605	1,724	1,733	1,750	1,771	1,833	2,319	4,910
People's Republic of China	China	1	259	2,873	3,321	4,643	4,645	4,648	4,668	4,730	4,746	4,746	4,750
	Portugal	0	0	0	160	1,007	1,410	1,576	1,735	1,822	1,971	2,507	4,505
	Guatemala	0	0	0	1	16	102	746	1,924	2,760	3,246	3,729	4,171
	Bulgaria	0	0	0	8	66	140	230	383	629	825	1,279	4,035
	Austria	0	0	0	155	630	696	734	748	762	824	1,213	3,619
	Tunisia	0	0	0	10	41	48	50	51	80	271	1,348	3,260
	Panama	0	0	0	24	178	330	620	1,397	1,995	2,364	2,688	3,060
	Honduras	0	0	0	2	71	201	485	1,312	1,858	2,323	2,669	2,909
	Israel	0	0	0	21	226	289	329	566	962	1,613	2,570	2,885
	Jordan	0	0	0	5	8	9	9	11	15	61	829	2,751
	Bosnia and Herzegovina	0	0	0	13	69	153	186	328	609	856	1,234	2,681
	Kazakhstan	0	0	0	2	25	41	188	793	1,878	2,075	2,219	2,477
	Algeria	0	0	0	35	450	653	912	1,210	1,510	1,736	1,956	2,431
	Greece	0	0	0	49	140	175	192	206	266	391	626	2,406
	Dominican Republic	0	0	0	51	301	502	747	1,160	1,710	2,105	2,245	2,331
	Nepal	0	0	0	0	0	8	32	60	268	619	1,432	2,320
	Moldova	0	0	0	5	119	295	547	778	995	1,320	1,785	2,304
	Armenia	0	0	0	3	33	139	453	749	881	963	1,363	2,193
	Japan	0	0	6	57	432	892	974	1,011	1,296	1,571	1,766	2,139
	Ireland	0	0	0	71	1,052	1,515	1,621	1,662	1,680	1,711	1,830	1,976
	Myanmar	0	0	0	1	6	6	6	6	6	310	1,237	1,941
	Croatia	0	0	0	6	69	103	107	145	186	280	546	1,786
Taliban	Afghanistan	0	0	0	4	64	269	778	1,287	1,410	1,462	1,536	1,774
	North Macedonia	0	0	0	11	77	133	302	486	603	739	994	1,763
	Paraguay	0	0	0	3	9	11	17	47	308	841	1,387	1,743
	Costa Rica	0	0	0	2	6	10	15	140	418	880	1,371	1,715
	Ethiopia	0	0	0	0	3	11	103	274	809	1,198	1,469	1,706
	Serbia	0	0	0	13	179	243	277	573	713	749	820	1,604
	Slovenia	0	0	0	18	97	113	114	121	133	155	391	1,567
	Kenya	0	0	0	1	17	64	148	341	577	711	996	1,469
	Oman	0	0	0	1	11	49	176	421	685	935	1,208	1,423
	Azerbaijan	0	0	0	4	23	61	206	441	531	590	718	1,361
	Georgia	0	0	0	0	6	12	15	17	19	40	335	1,303
	Kyrgyzstan	0	0	0	0	8	16	62	952	1,060	1,065	1,150	1,275
	Sudan	0	0	0	2	31	286	592	746	823	836	837	1,265
	Libya	0	0	0	0	3	5	24	74	242	559	857	1,183
	Nigeria	0	0	0	2	58	287	590	879	1,013	1,112	1,144	1,173
	Belarus	0	0	0	2	89	235	392	559	681	833	985	1,158
	El Salvador	0	0	0	0	9	46	174	448	717	843	975	1,114
	Puerto Rico	0	0	0	8	54	136	153	219	434	661	822	1,106
	Lebanon	0	0	0	12	24	27	34	59	167	367	637	1,018
	Kosovo	0	0	0	1	17	21	41	217	515	615	671	1,006
	Australia	0	0	1	20	92	102	104	196	652	886	907	908
	Venezuela	0	0	0	3	10	14	48	158	381	621	793	894
	Kuwait	0	0	0	0	26	212	354	447	531	610	779	880
	Denmark	0	0	0	90	452	574	605	615	624	650	721	837
	Palestine	0	0	0	1	2	5	11	85	173	368	555	822
	Slovakia	0	0	0	0	22	28	28	28	33	45	212	816
	Albania	0	0	0	14	30	32	65	157	284	387	509	810
	Lithuania	0	0	0	6	32	55	61	63	69	77	155	642
	Uzbekistan	0	0	0	2	9	15	26	143	322	474	568	610
	Yemen	0	0	0	0	2	80	312	494	567	588	600	606
	United Arab Emirates	0	0	0	6	105	264	315	351	384	419	495	572
	South Korea	0	0	17	165	248	271	282	301	324	415	466	526
	Montenegro	0	0	0	2	7	9	13	48	99	164	294	486
	Finland	0	0	0	58	260	305	309	312	315	329	349	452
	Cameroon	0	0	0	6	61	191	313	391	414	418	426	441
	Syria	0	0	0	2	3	5	9	43	112	200	288	417
	Malaysia	0	0	0	43	102	115	121	125	127	136	249	360
	Zambia	0	0	0	0	3	7	24	151	288	332	349	357
	Angola	0	0	0	2	2	4	13	51	108	183	284	348
	Bahrain	0	0	0	4	8	19	87	147	190	251	321	341
Democratic Republic of the Congo	DR Congo	0	0	0	8	31	71	169	214	258	272	307	333
	Senegal	0	0	0	0	9	42	112	205	284	311	324	333
	Norway	0	0	0	22	195	236	249	255	264	274	281	328
	Ghana	0	0	0	4	17	36	112	182	276	301	320	323
	Luxembourg	0	0	0	22	89	110	110	114	124	124	152	306
	Zimbabwe	0	0	0	1	4	4	7	67	202	228	243	277
	Jamaica	0	0	0	1	7	9	10	10	21	107	206	257
	Madagascar	0	0	0	0	0	6	20	106	192	230	244	251
	Qatar	0	0	0	2	10	38	113	174	197	214	232	237
	Haiti	0	0	0	0	7	41	105	161	201	229	232	233
	Latvia	0	0	0	0	16	25	30	32	34	37	74	210
	Uganda	0	0	0	0	0	0	0	3	32	75	111	205
	Malawi	0	0	0	0	3	4	16	114	175	179	184	185
	Mauritania	0	0	0	0	1	23	128	157	159	161	163	172
	Bahamas	0	0	0	0	11	11	11	14	43	95	142	163
	Nicaragua	0	0	0	1	4	35	74	116	137	151	156	160
	Mali	0	0	0	0	26	77	116	124	126	131	136	152
	Namibia	0	0	0	0	0	0	0	10	75	121	133	152
	Guyana	0	0	0	2	8	12	12	20	37	78	124	150
France	Guadeloupe	0	0	0	5	12	14	14	14	16	57	126	149
	Belize	0	0	0	0	2	2	2	2	13	26	58	147
	Malta	0	0	0	0	4	9	9	9	12	44	73	147
	Cuba	0	0	0	6	61	83	86	87	94	122	128	135
Côte d'Ivoire	Ivory Coast	0	0	0	0	14	33	66	102	115	120	124	132
	Mozambique	0	0	0	0	0	2	6	11	23	61	92	131
	Gambia	0	0	0	1	1	1	2	9	96	112	119	123
	Eswatini	0	0	0	0	1	2	11	40	91	109	117	122
	Sri Lanka	0	0	0	2	7	11	11	11	12	13	21	122
	Trinidad and Tobago	0	0	0	3	8	8	8	8	22	75	107	120
	Estonia	0	0	0	4	52	63	63	63	64	64	73	118
	Suriname	0	0	0	0	1	1	13	26	67	104	111	117
	Somalia	0	0	0	0	28	78	90	93	97	99	104	113
	Guam	0	0	0	2	5	5	5	5	10	49	79	112
	Cape Verde	0	0	0	1	1	4	15	23	40	60	95	104
	Chad	0	0	0	0	3	65	74	75	77	85	98	101
Republic of the Congo	Congo	0	0	0	2	9	20	41	56	78	89	92	94
	Tajikistan	0	0	0	0	0	47	52	60	68	76	82	86
	Equatorial Guinea	0	0	0	0	2	12	12	83	83	83	83	85
	Liberia	0	0	0	0	16	27	36	75	82	82	82	83
	Andorra	0	0	0	13	42	51	52	52	53	53	75	76
	Guinea	0	0	0	0	7	23	33	46	59	66	72	76
	Uruguay	0	0	0	1	15	22	27	35	44	48	58	76
	French Polynesia	0	0	0	0	0	0	0	0	0	7	29	75
	Sierra Leone	0	0	0	0	7	46	60	67	70	72	74	74
	Niger	0	0	0	3	32	64	67	69	69	69	69	72
France	French Guiana	0	0	0	0	1	1	15	43	59	66	70	70
	Burkina Faso	0	0	0	14	43	53	53	53	55	57	67	68
	Togo	0	0	0	1	9	13	14	18	27	48	55	64
	Central African Republic	0	0	0	0	0	2	47	59	62	62	62	63
	Djibouti	0	0	0	0	2	24	54	58	60	61	61	61
	South Sudan	0	0	0	0	0	10	38	46	47	49	59	61
	Thailand	0	0	1	12	54	57	58	58	58	59	59	60
	Gabon	0	0	0	1	3	17	42	49	53	54	55	59
	Cyprus	0	0	0	8	15	17	19	19	21	22	26	49
France	Mayotte	0	0	0	0	4	23	35	39	40	42	44	49
	Rwanda	0	0	0	0	0	1	2	5	16	29	35	49
	Maldives	0	0	0	0	1	6	8	17	29	34	38	47
	San Marino	0	0	1	28	41	42	42	42	42	42	42	46
	Aruba	0	0	0	0	2	3	3	3	10	26	37	45
	Lesotho	0	0	0	0	0	0	0	13	31	36	43	44
	Benin	0	0	0	0	2	3	21	36	40	41	41	43
	Guinea-Bissau	0	0	0	0	1	8	24	27	33	39	41	43
	Martinique	0	0	0	2	14	14	14	15	16	21	31	40
France	Réunion	0	0	0	0	0	1	2	4	5	16	22	40
	Isle of Man	0	0	0	0	27	34	34	34	34	34	34	35
	Vietnam	0	0	0	0	0	0	0	2	34	35	35	35
	Jersey	0	0	0	2	20	29	31	31	32	32	32	32
	Botswana	0	0	0	0	1	1	1	2	6	16	24	31
	Singapore	0	0	0	3	15	23	26	27	27	27	28	29
	Iceland	0	0	0	2	10	10	10	10	10	10	12	26
	New Zealand	0	0	0	1	19	22	22	22	22	25	25	25
	Sint Maarten	0	0	0	0	13	15	15	15	17	22	22	25
United States Virgin Islands	U.S. Virgin Islands	0	0	0	0	4	6	6	8	14	20	21	23
	Tanzania	0	0	0	1	17	21	21	21	21	21	21	21
	Liechtenstein	0	0	0	0	1	1	1	1	1	1	3	17
	São Tomé and Príncipe	0	0	0	0	1	10	11	15	15	15	16	17
	Guernsey	0	0	0	1	16	16	16	16	16	16	16	16
	Other	0	0	6	11	13	13	13	13	13	13	13	13
France	Saint Martin	0	0	0	2	3	3	3	3	5	8	9	12
	Mauritius	0	0	0	5	10	10	10	10	10	10	10	10
	Bermuda	0	0	0	0	6	9	9	9	9	9	9	9
	Barbados	0	0	0	0	7	7	7	7	7	7	7	7
	Comoros	0	0	0	0	0	2	7	7	7	7	7	7
	Papua New Guinea	0	0	0	0	0	0	0	2	5	7	7	7
	Turks and Caicos Islands	0	0	0	0	1	1	2	2	3	6	6	6
	Gibraltar	0	0	0	0	0	0	0	0	0	0	0	5
	Antigua and Barbuda	0	0	0	0	3	3	3	3	3	3	3	4
	Curaçao	0	0	0	1	1	1	1	1	1	1	1	4
	Bonaire	0	0	0	0	0	0	0	0	0	1	3	3
	Brunei	0	0	0	1	1	2	3	3	3	3	3	3
	Monaco	0	0	0	0	1	1	1	1	1	2	2	3
	Cayman Islands	0	0	0	1	1	1	1	1	1	1	1	2
	Fiji	0	0	0	0	0	0	0	1	2	2	2	2
	Northern Mariana Islands	0	0	0	0	2	2	2	2	2	2	2	2
	Saint Lucia	0	0	0	0	0	0	0	0	0	0	0	2
	British Virgin Islands	0	0	0	0	1	1	1	1	1	1	1	1
	Burundi	0	0	0	0	1	1	1	1	1	1	1	1
	Montserrat	0	0	0	0	1	1	1	1	1	1	1	1
	American Samoa	0	0	0	0	0	0	0	0	0	0	0	0
	Anguilla	0	0	0	0	0	0	0	0	0	0	0	0
	Bhutan	0	0	0	0	0	0	0	0	0	0	0	0
	Cambodia	0	0	0	0	0	0	0	0	0	0	0	0
	Cook Islands	0	0	0	0	0	0	0	0	0	0	0	0
	North Korea	0	0	0	0	0	0	0	0	0	0	0	0
	Dominica	0	0	0	0	0	0	0	0	0	0	0	0
	Eritrea	0	0	0	0	0	0	0	0	0	0	0	0
	Falkland Islands	0	0	0	0	0	0	0	0	0	0	0	0
	Faroe Islands	0	0	0	0	0	0	0	0	0	0	0	0
	Greenland	0	0	0	0	0	0	0	0	0	0	0	0
	Grenada	0	0	0	0	0	0	0	0	0	0	0	0
Vatican City	Holy See	0	0	0	0	0	0	0	0	0	0	0	0
	Kiribati	0	0	0	0	0	0	0	0	0	0	0	0
	Laos	0	0	0	0	0	0	0	0	0	0	0	0
	Marshall Islands	0	0	0	0	0	0	0	0	0	0	0	0
	Federated States of Micronesia	0	0	0	0	0	0	0	0	0	0	0	0
	Mongolia	0	0	0	0	0	0	0	0	0	0	0	0
	Nauru	0	0	0	0	0	0	0	0	0	0	0	0
	New Caledonia	0	0	0	0	0	0	0	0	0	0	0	0
	Niue	0	0	0	0	0	0	0	0	0	0	0	0
	Palau	0	0	0	0	0	0	0	0	0	0	0	0
	Pitcairn Islands	0	0	0	0	0	0	0	0	0	0	0	0
	Saba	0	0	0	0	0	0	0	0	0	0	0	0
France	Saint Barthélemy	0	0	0	0	0	0	0	0	0	0	0	0
	Saint Helena	0	0	0	0	0	0	0	0	0	0	0	0
	Saint Kitts and Nevis	0	0	0	0	0	0	0	0	0	0	0	0
France	Saint Pierre and Miquelon	0	0	0	0	0	0	0	0	0	0	0	0
	Saint Vincent and the Grenadines	0	0	0	0	0	0	0	0	0	0	0	0
	Samoa	0	0	0	0	0	0	0	0	0	0	0	0
	Seychelles	0	0	0	0	0	0	0	0	0	0	0	0
	Sint Eustatius	0	0	0	0	0	0	0	0	0	0	0	0
	Solomon Islands	0	0	0	0	0	0	0	0	0	0	0	0
East Timor	Timor-Leste	0	0	0	0	0	0	0	0	0	0	0	0
	Tokelau	0	0	0	0	0	0	0	0	0	0	0	0
	Tonga	0	0	0	0	0	0	0	0	0	0	0	0
	Turkmenistan	0	0	0	0	0	0	0	0	0	0	0	0
	Tuvalu	0	0	0	0	0	0	0	0	0	0	0	0
	Vanuatu	0	0	0	0	0	0	0	0	0	0	0	0
France	Wallis and Futuna	0	0	0	0	0	0	0	0	0	0	0	0

=== 2021 (first half) ===
2021 (first-half) monthly cumulative COVID-19 deaths
	Location	Jan 1	Feb 1	Mar 1	Apr 1	May 1	Jun 1
	World	1,916,081	2,344,913	2,650,107	2,934,629	3,303,598	3,679,813
	United States	356,783	455,613	521,837	553,934	574,601	591,392
	Brazil	193,875	223,945	254,221	317,646	401,186	461,931
	India	148,994	154,392	157,157	162,927	211,853	331,895
	Mexico	148,569	186,994	210,666	223,694	231,183	235,075
	Peru	93,192	103,396	121,940	142,864	166,382	183,879
	United Kingdom	73,512	106,158	122,849	126,713	127,517	127,782
	Italy	74,159	88,516	97,699	109,346	120,807	126,128
	Russia	57,555	73,619	86,455	99,233	110,520	121,873
	France	64,254	75,661	85,960	95,035	103,801	108,684
	Germany	33,624	57,120	70,105	76,543	83,082	88,595
	Colombia	42,909	53,650	59,660	63,255	73,230	88,282
	Spain	54,187	65,484	74,481	77,513	79,749	81,140
	Iran	55,223	57,959	60,073	62,665	71,758	80,156
	Argentina	43,163	47,931	51,965	55,736	63,508	77,456
	Poland	29,034	37,292	43,855	53,672	67,922	73,870
	South Africa	28,469	44,164	49,993	52,846	54,350	56,506
	Indonesia	22,329	30,277	36,325	41,054	45,652	50,723
	Ukraine	18,680	22,768	26,050	33,246	44,436	50,699
	Turkey	20,881	25,993	28,569	31,537	40,131	47,527
	Czech Republic	12,016	16,870	21,033	27,121	29,696	30,359
	Romania	15,767	18,335	20,350	23,538	28,109	30,312
	Hungary	9,667	12,578	15,058	20,995	27,701	29,762
	Chile	16,608	18,452	20,572	23,135	26,353	29,300
	Canada	15,472	19,942	21,960	22,926	24,169	25,512
	Belgium	19,720	21,283	22,254	23,067	24,271	24,980
	Philippines	9,244	10,749	12,318	13,297	17,234	20,966
	Pakistan	10,105	11,657	12,860	14,434	17,811	20,779
	Ecuador	14,034	14,859	15,811	16,847	18,631	20,572
	Bulgaria	7,576	9,045	10,191	13,197	16,399	17,700
	Netherlands	11,405	13,981	15,556	16,533	17,145	17,623
	Portugal	6,906	12,482	16,317	16,848	16,974	17,025
	Iraq	12,813	13,047	13,406	14,323	15,465	16,375
	Egypt	7,631	9,316	10,688	11,995	13,339	15,096
	Sweden	9,739	12,223	13,029	13,614	14,195	14,570
	Bolivia	9,149	10,330	11,628	12,239	12,951	14,471
	Japan	3,460	5,722	7,887	9,162	10,229	13,048
	Bangladesh	7,576	8,137	8,416	9,105	11,510	12,660
	Tunisia	4,676	6,754	8,001	8,812	10,722	12,654
	Slovakia	2,250	4,711	7,270	9,790	11,732	12,353
	Greece	4,838	5,872	6,580	8,169	10,457	12,171
	Austria	6,355	7,817	8,530	9,259	10,072	10,425
	Switzerland	7,598	9,179	9,621	9,912	10,163	10,308
	Jordan	3,834	4,316	4,701	6,858	8,836	9,462
	Bosnia and Herzegovina	4,072	4,705	5,096	6,581	8,533	9,235
	Morocco	7,388	8,275	8,623	8,818	9,023	9,147
	Paraguay	2,242	2,704	3,167	4,161	6,302	9,083
	Guatemala	4,813	5,643	6,393	6,840	7,524	8,165
	Croatia	3,920	5,027	5,526	5,947	7,081	8,026
	Lebanon	1,455	3,082	4,692	6,234	7,278	7,729
	Nepal	2,767	2,962	3,010	3,031	3,298	7,454
	Saudi Arabia	6,223	6,375	6,494	6,669	6,957	7,362
	Kazakhstan	2,749	3,126	3,389	5,912	6,561	7,321
	Serbia	3,211	4,020	4,443	5,308	6,362	6,865
	Israel	3,373	4,816	5,763	6,219	6,389	6,422
	Panama	3,975	5,244	5,831	6,109	6,227	6,370
	Honduras	3,130	3,592	4,141	4,599	5,261	6,316
	Moldova	2,985	3,438	3,949	4,960	5,812	6,107
	North Macedonia	2,503	2,855	3,137	3,781	4,855	5,413
People's Republic of China	China	4,789	4,825	4,844	4,851	4,857	4,970
	Ireland	2,159	3,241	4,286	4,662	4,892	4,941
	Azerbaijan	2,609	3,126	3,218	3,567	4,517	4,913
	Georgia	2,528	3,194	3,520	3,785	4,130	4,804
	Slovenia	2,982	3,834	4,159	4,378	4,590	4,705
	Armenia	2,828	3,084	3,195	3,533	4,128	4,445
	Lithuania	1,845	2,849	3,270	3,590	3,947	4,289
	Uruguay	174	431	603	953	2,563	4,213
	Ethiopia	1,923	2,093	2,365	2,865	3,688	4,165
	Costa Rica	2,171	2,612	2,803	2,957	3,217	4,022
	Palestine	1,529	2,012	2,259	2,881	3,517	3,765
	Dominican Republic	2,414	2,666	3,100	3,325	3,480	3,628
	Algeria	2,756	2,891	2,983	3,093	3,253	3,472
	Myanmar	2,697	3,138	3,199	3,206	3,209	3,217
	Kenya	1,670	1,763	1,856	2,153	2,724	3,172
	Libya	1,478	1,877	2,179	2,667	3,029	3,126
Taliban	Afghanistan	2,201	2,404	2,444	2,489	2,631	2,973
	Belarus	1,424	1,718	1,976	2,247	2,542	2,851
	Malaysia	471	760	1,130	1,272	1,506	2,796
	Sudan	1,576	1,812	1,890	2,087	2,361	2,631
	Venezuela	1,025	1,183	1,338	1,589	2,117	2,629
	Denmark	1,298	2,125	2,361	2,419	2,485	2,516
	Puerto Rico	1,503	1,829	2,036	2,113	2,303	2,502
	Albania	1,181	1,380	1,796	2,235	2,394	2,451
	Latvia	635	1,195	1,618	1,899	2,131	2,376
	Oman	1,499	1,529	1,570	1,678	2,010	2,345
	El Salvador	1,336	1,623	1,854	2,010	2,124	2,249
	Kosovo	1,325	1,488	1,589	1,862	2,163	2,233
	Nigeria	1,289	1,586	1,907	2,057	2,063	2,099
	South Korea	917	1,425	1,605	1,735	1,831	1,963
	Kyrgyzstan	1,356	1,412	1,466	1,500	1,612	1,815
	Kuwait	934	959	1,083	1,313	1,563	1,772
	Syria	711	921	1,027	1,265	1,592	1,770
	United Arab Emirates	669	850	1,221	1,497	1,587	1,680
	Zimbabwe	363	1,217	1,463	1,523	1,567	1,596
	Montenegro	681	802	999	1,266	1,492	1,583
	Sri Lanka	204	323	476	571	687	1,527
	Yemen	611	616	635	889	1,227	1,321
	Zambia	388	763	1,091	1,208	1,251	1,281
	Cameroon	448	462	551	779	1,064	1,275
	Estonia	234	422	598	908	1,166	1,258
	Malawi	189	702	1,040	1,117	1,148	1,155
	Senegal	410	628	872	1,051	1,107	1,139
	Thailand	63	77	83	94	224	1,069
	Bahrain	352	375	449	521	646	980
	Finland	597	702	784	881	932	970
	Cuba	146	214	322	424	644	958
	Jamaica	302	350	422	596	778	948
	Australia	909	909	909	909	910	910
	Botswana	40	134	310	568	712	849
	Madagascar	261	281	297	409	643	839
	Mozambique	166	367	641	775	814	836
	Namibia	205	352	424	523	643	830
	Luxembourg	495	579	637	743	794	814
	Ghana	335	416	607	743	779	785
	Norway	433	563	622	660	753	783
Democratic Republic of the Congo	DR Congo	591	671	707	743	766	782
	Somalia	130	130	239	529	713	769
	Angola	405	466	508	537	596	766
	Uzbekistan	614	621	622	630	650	690
	Eswatini	206	565	652	667	671	673
	Qatar	245	248	258	291	458	556
	Mali	269	330	353	385	484	517
	Trinidad and Tobago	126	134	139	142	165	479
	Mauritania	324	418	439	449	455	463
	Malta	225	270	315	394	415	419
	Guyana	164	176	195	231	295	385
	Cyprus	128	202	235	260	316	365
	Uganda	304	324	334	334	343	362
	Rwanda	92	196	261	307	335	353
	Lesotho	50	160	292	315	316	326
	Belize	242	301	314	317	323	324
	Haiti	236	245	250	251	254	321
Côte d'Ivoire	Ivory Coast	137	154	192	244	286	305
	Suriname	121	154	170	177	201	292
	Mongolia	0	2	2	8	110	276
	Cape Verde	113	134	147	168	217	264
France	Guadeloupe	155	157	164	173	211	255
	Bahamas	170	176	180	188	199	230
	Cambodia	0	0	0	14	96	220
	Niger	102	159	172	187	191	192
France	Réunion	42	46	52	115	148	189
	Nicaragua	165	169	173	178	182	186
	Gambia	124	128	150	164	174	179
France	Mayotte	55	61	110	161	170	173
	Chad	104	118	140	164	170	173
	Maldives	48	52	62	67	73	169
	Burkina Faso	85	120	142	146	157	166
	Papua New Guinea	9	9	13	60	115	162
	Guinea	81	82	89	125	144	161
	Djibouti	61	63	63	70	143	154
Republic of the Congo	Congo	100	117	128	135	144	153
	Gabon	64	68	83	118	139	152
	Comoros	9	93	144	146	146	146
	French Polynesia	114	131	139	141	141	142
	Guam	122	129	131	134	136	139
	Andorra	84	101	110	115	125	127
	Togo	68	77	84	109	123	125
	Curaçao	14	20	22	33	108	122
	Equatorial Guinea	86	86	91	102	112	118
France	French Guiana	71	76	85	93	100	116
	South Sudan	63	64	93	112	115	115
	Aruba	49	58	71	85	98	107
	Benin	44	52	70	93	99	101
	Central African Republic	63	63	63	72	88	98
	Martinique	43	44	45	50	70	95
	Gibraltar	6	75	93	94	94	94
	Tajikistan	90	91	91	91	91	91
	San Marino	59	67	74	84	90	90
	Liberia	83	84	85	85	85	86
	Saint Lucia	5	13	35	60	74	79
	Sierra Leone	76	79	79	79	79	79
	Jersey	42	66	69	69	69	69
	Guinea-Bissau	45	45	48	63	67	68
	Liechtenstein	44	53	55	56	56	57
	Vietnam	35	35	35	35	35	47
	Barbados	7	12	33	42	44	47
	Antigua and Barbuda	5	7	14	28	32	42
	Seychelles	0	4	11	21	27	40
	Isle of Man	35	35	35	39	39	39
	São Tomé and Príncipe	17	17	29	34	35	37
	Singapore	29	29	29	30	30	33
	Bermuda	10	12	12	12	27	32
	Monaco	3	13	24	28	32	32
	Iceland	29	29	29	29	29	30
	Sint Maarten	27	27	27	27	27	28
United States Virgin Islands	U.S. Virgin Islands	23	24	25	26	27	27
	New Zealand	25	25	26	26	26	26
	Tanzania	21	21	21	21	21	21
	Mauritius	10	10	10	12	16	18
	Turks and Caicos Islands	6	9	14	17	17	17
	Guernsey	16	16	17	17	17	17
	Bonaire	3	3	4	10	16	17
East Timor	Timor-Leste	0	0	0	0	3	16
France	Saint Martin	12	12	12	12	13	15
	Eritrea	3	7	7	10	10	14
	Other	13	13	13	13	13	13
	Saint Vincent and the Grenadines	0	2	8	10	11	12
France	Wallis and Futuna	0	0	0	4	7	7
	Burundi	2	2	3	6	6	6
	Fiji	2	2	2	2	2	4
	Laos	0	0	0	0	0	3
	Brunei	3	3	3	3	3	3
	Cayman Islands	2	2	2	2	2	2
	Northern Mariana Islands	2	2	2	2	2	2
	Grenada	1	1	1	1	1	1
	British Virgin Islands	1	1	1	1	1	1
	Faroe Islands	0	1	1	1	1	1
France	Saint Barthélemy	0	0	0	1	1	1
	Bhutan	0	1	1	1	1	1
	Montserrat	1	1	1	1	1	1
	New Caledonia	0	0	0	0	0	0
	Dominica	0	0	0	0	0	0
	Saint Kitts and Nevis	0	0	0	0	0	0
	Anguilla	0	0	0	0	0	0
	American Samoa	0	0	0	0	0	0
	Cook Islands	0	0	0	0	0	0
	North Korea	0	0	0	0	0	0
	Falkland Islands	0	0	0	0	0	0
	Greenland	0	0	0	0	0	0
Vatican City	Holy See	0	0	0	0	0	0
	Kiribati	0	0	0	0	0	0
	Marshall Islands	0	0	0	0	0	0
	Federated States of Micronesia	0	0	0	0	0	0
	Nauru	0	0	0	0	0	0
	Niue	0	0	0	0	0	0
	Palau	0	0	0	0	0	0
	Pitcairn Islands	0	0	0	0	0	0
	Saba	0	0	0	0	0	0
	Saint Helena	0	0	0	0	0	0
France	Saint Pierre and Miquelon	0	0	0	0	0	0
	Samoa	0	0	0	0	0	0
	Sint Eustatius	0	0	0	0	0	0
	Solomon Islands	0	0	0	0	0	0
	Tokelau	0	0	0	0	0	0
	Tonga	0	0	0	0	0	0
	Turkmenistan	0	0	0	0	0	0
	Tuvalu	0	0	0	0	0	0
	Vanuatu	0	0	0	0	0	0

=== 2021 (second half) ===
Sorted by December.

2021 (second-half) monthly cumulative COVID-19 deaths
	Location	Jul 1	Aug 1	Sep 1	Oct 1	Nov 1	Dec 1
	World	3,954,147	4,229,169	4,536,307	4,794,137	5,005,025	5,215,745
	United States	600,853	610,606	642,770	697,430	743,217	774,868
	Brazil	515,985	555,460	579,574	596,122	607,694	614,376
	India	399,459	424,351	439,020	448,339	458,437	469,247
	Mexico	238,055	245,959	267,253	283,091	290,717	293,950
	Russia	135,886	159,352	184,014	208,142	239,693	276,419
	Peru	192,331	196,291	198,263	199,367	200,217	201,144
	United Kingdom	128,140	129,654	132,535	136,662	140,632	144,969
	Indonesia	58,995	95,723	133,676	142,026	143,423	143,840
	Italy	127,566	128,063	129,221	130,921	132,100	133,828
	Iran	84,264	90,630	107,794	120,428	126,303	129,830
	Colombia	105,934	120,432	124,883	126,261	127,258	128,473
	France	110,133	110,795	112,743	114,447	115,244	116,655
	Argentina	93,668	105,586	111,607	115,179	115,950	116,554
	Germany	90,938	91,659	92,223	93,711	95,752	101,790
	South Africa	60,647	72,013	82,261	87,626	89,177	89,843
	Spain	81,744	82,725	85,574	87,006	87,568	88,052
	Ukraine	52,391	52,951	53,833	56,446	68,027	86,532
	Poland	75,058	75,271	75,368	75,673	77,019	84,153
	Turkey	49,732	51,332	56,710	64,054	70,611	76,842
	Romania	33,786	34,281	34,570	37,041	47,751	56,529
	Philippines	24,662	27,889	33,448	38,294	43,172	48,545
	Chile	32,545	35,448	36,937	37,468	37,757	38,346
	Hungary	29,992	30,026	30,059	30,199	30,881	34,713
	Ecuador	21,560	31,631	32,244	32,767	32,980	33,250
	Czech Republic	30,439	30,455	30,483	30,528	30,863	33,186
	Malaysia	5,170	9,024	16,664	26,335	28,912	30,425
	Canada	26,273	26,592	26,918	27,819	28,965	29,670
	Pakistan	22,281	23,360	25,788	27,729	28,449	28,728
	Bulgaria	18,061	18,213	18,896	20,882	23,999	28,453
	Bangladesh	14,646	20,916	26,274	27,531	27,870	27,981
	Belgium	25,181	25,251	25,388	25,613	26,053	27,015
	Tunisia	14,959	19,858	23,538	24,890	25,241	25,373
	Vietnam	87	1,306	11,064	19,301	22,083	25,252
	Iraq	17,186	18,657	20,830	22,260	23,170	23,820
	Thailand	2,080	4,990	11,841	16,850	19,260	20,814
	Egypt	16,169	16,524	16,736	17,331	18,651	20,474
	Netherlands	17,744	17,826	18,010	18,170	18,411	19,414
	Bolivia	16,702	17,806	18,429	18,726	18,925	19,171
	Myanmar	3,347	9,731	15,490	17,789	18,714	19,104
	Portugal	17,096	17,361	17,743	17,975	18,157	18,441
	Japan	14,781	15,192	16,041	17,648	18,268	18,360
	Greece	12,763	13,016	13,698	14,828	15,938	18,157
	Kazakhstan	7,759	9,077	13,732	16,055	17,150	17,856
	Paraguay	12,763	14,929	15,742	16,195	16,246	16,469
	Guatemala	9,215	10,339	11,926	13,564	15,050	15,928
	Sweden	14,660	14,677	14,724	14,903	15,058	15,151
	Morocco	9,296	9,785	12,649	14,267	14,668	14,776
	Slovakia	12,511	12,540	12,548	12,649	13,045	14,503
	Sri Lanka	3,063	4,451	9,400	12,964	13,760	14,346
	Bosnia and Herzegovina	9,647	9,689	9,803	10,606	11,555	12,586
	Georgia	5,327	5,853	7,482	8,976	10,089	12,119
	Austria	10,508	10,528	10,583	10,810	11,114	12,064
	Serbia	7,047	7,114	7,292	8,234	9,955	11,691
	Jordan	9,750	10,032	10,411	10,718	11,038	11,608
	Nepal	9,145	9,875	10,770	11,148	11,416	11,529
	Switzerland	10,366	10,387	10,489	10,683	10,834	11,091
	Croatia	8,206	8,259	8,334	8,640	9,220	10,899
	Honduras	6,980	7,834	8,850	9,777	10,240	10,403
	Moldova	6,194	6,255	6,401	6,777	7,790	9,119
	Saudi Arabia	7,819	8,237	8,545	8,716	8,794	8,836
	Lebanon	7,851	7,906	8,053	8,325	8,502	8,725
	Cuba	1,284	2,758	5,303	7,436	8,236	8,304
	Israel	6,430	6,485	7,118	7,796	8,114	8,196
	Azerbaijan	4,974	5,023	5,636	6,525	7,074	7,856
	Armenia	4,517	4,619	4,857	5,339	6,379	7,610
	North Macedonia	5,484	5,493	5,938	6,714	7,147	7,581
	Panama	6,536	6,808	7,054	7,223	7,315	7,362
Taliban	Afghanistan	4,962	6,737	7,123	7,206	7,280	7,308
	Costa Rica	4,661	5,030	5,492	6,349	7,047	7,287
	Lithuania	4,392	4,417	4,573	5,021	5,921	6,759
	Ethiopia	4,320	4,385	4,675	5,582	6,459	6,755
	Uruguay	5,558	5,959	6,029	6,054	6,077	6,130
	Algeria	3,716	4,254	5,269	5,812	5,920	6,071
People's Republic of China	China	5,495	5,635	5,683	5,691	5,696	5,697
	Ireland	4,998	5,035	5,092	5,249	5,436	5,652
	Slovenia	4,754	4,764	4,785	4,915	5,139	5,551
	Libya	3,193	3,509	4,247	4,651	5,099	5,456
	Kenya	3,634	3,931	4,726	5,123	5,281	5,335
	Venezuela	3,101	3,576	4,010	4,454	4,884	5,144
	Belarus	3,143	3,454	3,780	4,143	4,631	5,081
	Palestine	3,831	3,872	3,948	4,366	4,681	4,803
	Zimbabwe	1,789	3,532	4,419	4,623	4,678	4,707
	Dominican Republic	3,822	3,963	4,008	4,046	4,130	4,204
	Latvia	2,513	2,556	2,578	2,717	3,250	4,179
	Oman	3,100	3,836	4,064	4,096	4,111	4,113
	El Salvador	2,381	2,629	2,918	3,234	3,622	3,776
	Zambia	2,199	3,389	3,602	3,648	3,661	3,667
	South Korea	2,021	2,098	2,292	2,497	2,859	3,658
	Namibia	1,521	3,044	3,244	3,511	3,552	3,573
	Puerto Rico	2,549	2,580	2,860	3,149	3,234	3,270
	Uganda	1,061	2,696	3,014	3,161	3,215	3,252
	Sudan	2,760	2,780	2,793	2,878	3,046	3,159
	Albania	2,456	2,457	2,498	2,698	2,924	3,096
	Nigeria	2,120	2,149	2,455	2,721	2,896	2,977
	Kosovo	2,248	2,256	2,494	2,943	2,967	2,974
	Cambodia	602	1,397	1,903	2,319	2,788	2,940
	Denmark	2,534	2,549	2,584	2,656	2,714	2,895
	Kyrgyzstan	2,009	2,335	2,532	2,607	2,672	2,749
	Syria	1,876	1,914	2,013	2,247	2,566	2,749
	Kuwait	1,969	2,320	2,419	2,449	2,461	2,465
	Botswana	1,125	1,569	2,261	2,368	2,406	2,418
	Jamaica	1,075	1,190	1,518	1,869	2,236	2,392
	Malawi	1,196	1,635	2,177	2,282	2,301	2,306
	Montenegro	1,610	1,629	1,720	1,919	2,100	2,300
	United Arab Emirates	1,811	1,949	2,041	2,097	2,136	2,147
	Trinidad and Tobago	833	1,070	1,285	1,474	1,696	2,134
	Australia	910	923	1,006	1,289	1,734	2,006
	Yemen	1,361	1,375	1,472	1,721	1,889	1,950
	Mozambique	878	1,434	1,864	1,917	1,930	1,941
	Mongolia	563	820	839	1,222	1,672	1,932
	Senegal	1,166	1,353	1,765	1,858	1,878	1,885
	Cameroon	1,324	1,334	1,357	1,459	1,686	1,804
	Estonia	1,269	1,272	1,293	1,357	1,540	1,803
	Angola	900	1,011	1,217	1,537	1,710	1,733
	Uzbekistan	740	880	1,088	1,242	1,325	1,406
	Bahrain	1,352	1,384	1,388	1,389	1,393	1,394
	Finland	979	1,001	1,054	1,116	1,238	1,348
	Rwanda	427	808	1,083	1,273	1,331	1,342
	Somalia	775	811	977	1,111	1,208	1,327
	Eswatini	678	787	1,101	1,220	1,242	1,248
	Ghana	796	823	1,036	1,156	1,175	1,209
	Suriname	516	645	718	879	1,090	1,166
Democratic Republic of the Congo	DR Congo	924	1,038	1,059	1,084	1,098	1,107
	Norway	792	799	820	869	917	1,054
	Guyana	468	535	613	783	913	992
	Madagascar	909	947	956	960	963	967
	Luxembourg	818	822	830	835	845	875
	Mauritania	489	562	715	774	797	832
France	Guadeloupe	267	283	508	767	820	823
	Haiti	443	558	586	629	679	738
	Tanzania	21	21	50	719	725	730
	Singapore	36	37	55	95	407	718
	Martinique	98	129	460	628	683	715
Côte d'Ivoire	Ivory Coast	313	329	441	624	695	704
	Fiji	21	239	496	624	674	696
	Bahamas	246	287	381	533	643	671
	Lesotho	329	374	403	632	658	662
	French Polynesia	142	149	423	621	636	636
	Qatar	590	601	602	606	610	611
	Mali	525	532	539	548	563	606
	Cyprus	379	429	520	560	584	597
	Belize	329	337	359	409	491	574
	Papua New Guinea	174	192	192	234	370	546
	Malta	420	423	441	457	461	468
	Mauritius	18	20	31	90	176	422
	Guinea	171	220	335	379	385	387
France	Réunion	237	275	342	366	374	384
Republic of the Congo	Congo	166	178	183	197	278	354
	Cape Verde	286	298	313	339	349	350
	Gambia	181	213	319	338	340	342
France	French Guiana	145	187	219	267	308	327
	Liberia	128	148	245	286	287	287
	Burkina Faso	168	169	171	184	214	286
	Saint Lucia	84	89	103	201	255	280
	Gabon	159	164	165	186	239	279
	New Caledonia	0	0	0	119	265	276
	Guam	140	143	149	197	238	263
	Niger	193	195	199	202	213	259
	Maldives	213	221	226	231	243	250
	Togo	129	152	185	229	242	243
	Barbados	47	48	50	69	153	229
	Nicaragua	191	195	200	204	208	213
	Grenada	1	1	1	139	198	200
	Djibouti	155	156	157	167	181	186
France	Mayotte	174	174	175	178	185	185
	Curaçao	126	126	143	162	174	178
	Chad	174	174	174	174	174	175
	Equatorial Guinea	121	123	124	147	167	175
	Aruba	107	109	139	166	171	174
	Laos	3	7	14	18	65	170
	Benin	104	108	128	159	161	161
	Comoros	146	147	147	147	147	150
	Guinea-Bissau	69	76	119	135	141	148
	South Sudan	117	119	120	130	133	133
	Andorra	127	128	130	130	130	131
	Tajikistan	91	122	125	125	125	125
	Seychelles	57	86	102	112	114	122
East Timor	Timor-Leste	24	26	72	117	122	122
	Sierra Leone	100	120	121	121	121	121
	Antigua and Barbuda	42	43	44	79	102	117
	Bermuda	33	33	33	72	101	106
	Central African Republic	98	98	100	100	100	101
	Gibraltar	94	94	97	97	98	98
	San Marino	90	90	90	91	92	93
United States Virgin Islands	U.S. Virgin Islands	30	37	54	71	81	86
	Jersey	69	69	77	78	80	81
	Sint Maarten	33	34	51	66	75	75
	Saint Vincent and the Grenadines	12	12	12	21	66	74
	Isle of Man	39	43	48	52	57	66
	Eritrea	23	35	38	42	45	60
	Liechtenstein	58	58	58	58	58	58
	Brunei	3	3	9	32	54	57
	São Tomé and Príncipe	37	37	37	50	56	56
	New Zealand	26	26	26	27	28	44
	British Virgin Islands	1	31	37	37	37	38
France	Saint Martin	27	30	17	35	37	38
	Dominica	0	0	4	20	32	37
	Monaco	33	33	35	35	36	36
	Iceland	30	30	33	33	33	35
	Saint Kitts and Nevis	3	3	3	13	23	28
	Turks and Caicos Islands	18	18	20	23	23	24
	Guernsey	17	17	18	21	23	23
	Bonaire	17	17	17	19	19	22
	Burundi	8	9	10	14	14	14
	Faroe Islands	1	1	2	2	2	13
	Other	13	13	13	13	13	13
France	Wallis and Futuna	7	7	7	7	7	7
	Cayman Islands	2	2	2	2	2	5
France	Saint Barthélemy	1	1	1	2	4	4
	Anguilla	0	0	0	1	1	3
	Bhutan	1	2	3	3	3	3
	Northern Mariana Islands	2	2	2	2	3	3
	Montserrat	1	1	1	1	1	1
	American Samoa	0	0	0	0	0	0
	Cook Islands	0	0	0	0	0	0
	North Korea	0	0	0	0	0	0
	Falkland Islands	0	0	0	0	0	0
	Greenland	0	0	0	0	0	0
Vatican City	Holy See	0	0	0	0	0	0
	Kiribati	0	0	0	0	0	0
	Marshall Islands	0	0	0	0	0	0
	Federated States of Micronesia	0	0	0	0	0	0
	Nauru	0	0	0	0	0	0
	Niue	0	0	0	0	0	0
	Palau	0	0	0	0	0	0
	Pitcairn Islands	0	0	0	0	0	0
	Saba	0	0	0	0	0	0
	Saint Helena	0	0	0	0	0	0
France	Saint Pierre and Miquelon	0	0	0	0	0	0
	Samoa	0	0	0	0	0	0
	Sint Eustatius	0	0	0	0	0	0
	Solomon Islands	0	0	0	0	0	0
	Tokelau	0	0	0	0	0	0
	Tonga	0	0	0	0	0	0
	Turkmenistan	0	0	0	0	0	0
	Tuvalu	0	0	0	0	0	0
	Vanuatu	0	0	0	0	0	0

=== 2022 ===
Sorted by March. Locations link to COVID-19 pages.

2022 monthly cumulative COVID-19 deaths
	Location	Jan 1	Feb 1	Mar 1
	World	5,440,722	5,682,684	5,954,004
	United States	819,197	881,867	941,112
	Brazil	618,984	626,854	649,134
	India	481,486	496,242	514,023
	Russia	309,707	332,012	352,446
	Mexico	301,663	310,131	318,149
	Peru	202,653	205,505	210,538
	United Kingdom	149,790	157,677	161,754
	Italy	137,402	146,498	154,767
	Indonesia	144,096	144,348	148,660
	Colombia	129,901	134,079	138,693
	Iran	131,606	132,454	136,838
	France	121,149	128,120	135,262
	Argentina	117,146	120,988	126,152
	Germany	112,109	117,974	122,937
	Poland	97,559	105,435	111,586
	Ukraine	96,089	100,395	106,129
	Spain	90,556	95,902	99,875
	South Africa	91,145	95,093	99,412
	Turkey	82,361	87,416	94,445
	Romania	58,752	60,025	63,414
	Philippines	51,504	54,003	56,451
	Hungary	39,186	41,471	44,051
	Chile	39,115	39,721	42,353
	Vietnam	32,394	37,777	40,252
	Czech Republic	36,324	37,347	38,750
	Canada	30,280	33,722	36,537
	Bulgaria	30,955	33,318	35,581
	Ecuador	33,672	34,514	35,244
	Malaysia	31,487	31,978	32,749
	Belgium	28,403	29,161	30,208
	Pakistan	28,927	29,269	30,178
	Bangladesh	28,076	28,425	29,045
	Tunisia	25,569	26,288	27,784
	Greece	20,790	23,500	25,860
	Iraq	24,158	24,389	24,989
	Egypt	21,752	22,635	24,074
	Japan	18,393	18,792	23,633
	Thailand	21,708	22,185	22,976
	Netherlands	20,920	21,265	21,554
	Bolivia	19,680	20,919	21,441
	Portugal	18,955	19,905	21,063
	Myanmar	19,272	19,310	19,372
	Kazakhstan	18,231	18,528	18,947
	Slovakia	16,665	17,850	18,530
	Paraguay	16,629	17,260	18,359
	Sweden	15,377	16,245	17,416
	Guatemala	16,106	16,379	16,971
	Sri Lanka	14,995	15,473	16,244
	Georgia	13,860	15,016	16,199
	Morocco	14,849	15,400	15,988
	Bosnia and Herzegovina	13,442	14,447	15,459
	Serbia	12,714	13,629	15,241
	Croatia	12,538	13,827	15,069
	Austria	13,351	13,617	14,213
	Jordan	12,653	13,217	13,835
	Switzerland	11,921	12,372	12,683
	Nepal	11,594	11,752	11,938
	Moldova	10,275	10,666	11,228
	Honduras	10,434	10,504	10,775
	Israel	8,258	8,990	10,234
	Lebanon	9,119	9,606	10,091
	Azerbaijan	8,358	8,734	9,417
	North Macedonia	7,976	8,439	9,025
	Saudi Arabia	8,877	8,940	8,998
	Cuba	8,322	8,399	8,494
	Armenia	7,975	8,056	8,478
	Lithuania	7,404	7,891	8,431
	South Korea	5,625	6,772	8,170
	Panama	7,427	7,716	8,079
	Costa Rica	7,357	7,555	8,031
Taliban	Afghanistan	7,356	7,414	7,598
	Ethiopia	6,926	7,337	7,462
	Slovenia	6,124	6,457	7,049
	Uruguay	6,169	6,459	6,977
	Algeria	6,271	6,579	6,835
	Ireland	6,070	6,346	6,497
	Belarus	5,578	6,052	6,480
	Libya	5,710	6,017	6,261
People's Republic of China	China	5,699	5,700	6,233
	Kenya	5,376	5,583	5,639
	Venezuela	5,324	5,440	5,633
	Palestine	4,934	5,104	5,513
	Zimbabwe	4,997	5,338	5,395
	Latvia	4,570	4,873	5,224
	Australia	2,239	3,758	5,171
	Denmark	3,266	3,755	4,612
	Dominican Republic	4,247	4,307	4,368
	Oman	4,116	4,146	4,244
	Puerto Rico	3,305	3,855	4,110
	El Salvador	3,824	3,899	4,071
	Namibia	3,616	3,967	4,009
	Zambia	3,730	3,917	3,952
	Sudan	3,337	3,533	3,909
	Trinidad and Tobago	2,850	3,404	3,628
	Uganda	3,294	3,538	3,588
	Albania	3,217	3,346	3,469
	Nigeria	3,031	3,136	3,142
	Kosovo	2,980	3,005	3,104
	Syria	2,897	2,989	3,075
	Cambodia	3,012	3,015	3,032
	Kyrgyzstan	2,802	2,884	2,958
	Jamaica	2,473	2,658	2,813
	Montenegro	2,407	2,555	2,676
	Botswana	2,444	2,581	2,619
	Malawi	2,364	2,561	2,615
	Kuwait	2,468	2,497	2,538
	Finland	1,745	2,262	2,386
	United Arab Emirates	2,164	2,243	2,301
	Estonia	1,938	2,037	2,248
	Mozambique	1,976	2,173	2,192
	Yemen	1,984	2,012	2,135
	Mongolia	1,986	2,040	2,096
	Senegal	1,890	1,946	1,960
	Cameroon	1,851	1,880	1,923
	Angola	1,757	1,895	1,900
	Norway	1,305	1,465	1,659
	Uzbekistan	1,485	1,568	1,636
	Rwanda	1,350	1,440	1,457
	Bahrain	1,394	1,408	1,454
	Ghana	1,287	1,395	1,442
	Eswatini	1,303	1,375	1,390
	Madagascar	1,027	1,274	1,366
	Somalia	1,333	1,335	1,348
Democratic Republic of the Congo	DR Congo	1,205	1,278	1,335
	Suriname	1,189	1,261	1,316
	Guyana	1,052	1,166	1,220
	Singapore	828	855	1,019
	Luxembourg	916	952	991
	Mauritania	863	953	979
France	Guadeloupe	831	873	918
	Mauritius	786	786	904
	Martinique	784	832	894
	Cyprus	643	747	859
	Fiji	698	801	834
	Haiti	766	804	820
	Tanzania	737	778	798
Côte d'Ivoire	Ivory Coast	712	785	793
	Bahamas	717	746	771
	Mali	660	714	722
	Lesotho	671	693	697
	Qatar	618	645	670
France	Réunion	409	500	666
	Belize	598	625	650
	French Polynesia	636	636	641
	Papua New Guinea	590	597	638
	Laos	372	547	621
	Malta	477	550	605
	Guinea	391	416	440
	Cape Verde	352	396	401
France	French Guiana	339	371	391
Republic of the Congo	Congo	367	371	378
	Burkina Faso	318	366	375
	Gambia	343	364	365
	Saint Lucia	295	328	358
	Guam	270	290	322
	Barbados	260	279	316
	Niger	274	298	307
	Gabon	288	301	303
	New Caledonia	281	283	299
	Maldives	262	277	297
	Liberia	287	290	294
	Togo	248	268	272
	Curaçao	189	229	261
	Nicaragua	217	220	224
	Grenada	200	210	216
	Aruba	181	193	211
	Chad	181	190	190
	Djibouti	189	189	189
France	Mayotte	185	187	187
	Equatorial Guinea	175	182	182
	Guinea-Bissau	149	156	167
	Benin	161	163	163
	Seychelles	126	142	163
	Comoros	158	159	160
	Andorra	140	145	151
	South Sudan	136	137	137
	Antigua and Barbuda	119	127	135
East Timor	Timor-Leste	122	122	128
	Sierra Leone	123	125	125
	Tajikistan	125	125	125
	Bermuda	110	116	123
	Central African Republic	101	110	113
	Jersey	89	100	112
	San Marino	100	109	112
United States Virgin Islands	U.S. Virgin Islands	89	101	109
	Saint Vincent and the Grenadines	83	94	106
	Eritrea	76	98	103
	Gibraltar	100	101	101
	Solomon Islands	0	12	99
	Sint Maarten	75	79	85
	Isle of Man	67	71	80
	Brunei	57	59	76
	Liechtenstein	69	71	75
	São Tomé and Príncipe	57	69	72
	British Virgin Islands	39	49	62
	Iceland	37	46	62
	Dominica	47	51	57
	New Zealand	51	53	56
	Monaco	38	47	51
France	Saint Martin	40	43	44
	Saint Kitts and Nevis	28	33	42
	Turks and Caicos Islands	26	34	36
	Guernsey	24	30	31
	Northern Mariana Islands	13	23	30
	Bonaire	23	27	28
	Faroe Islands	14	18	28
	Greenland	1	6	18
	Cayman Islands	11	15	17
	Burundi	14	15	15
	Other	13	13	13
	Kiribati	0	0	11
	Anguilla	5	8	9
France	Wallis and Futuna	7	7	7
	Bhutan	3	4	6
	Palau	0	0	6
France	Saint Barthélemy	4	4	4
	Sint Eustatius	0	1	3
	Montserrat	1	1	2
France	Saint Pierre and Miquelon	0	1	1
	American Samoa	0	0	0
	Cook Islands	0	0	0
	North Korea	0	0	0
	Falkland Islands	0	0	0
Vatican City	Holy See	0	0	0
	Marshall Islands	0	0	0
	Federated States of Micronesia	0	0	0
	Nauru	0	0	0
	Niue	0	0	0
	Pitcairn Islands	0	0	0
	Saba	0	0	0
	Saint Helena	0	0	0
	Samoa	0	0	0
	Tokelau	0	0	0
	Tonga	0	0	0
	Turkmenistan	0	0	0
	Tuvalu	0	0	0
	Vanuatu	0	0	0

== See also ==
- List of epidemics
- List of deaths due to COVID-19 – notable individual deaths
- COVID-19 vaccine
- Deployment of COVID-19 vaccines
