= COVID-19 deaths =

COVID-19 deaths may refer to:

- COVID-19 pandemic deaths, for statistics on COVID-19 deaths by region
- COVID-19 pandemic death rates by country, for statistics on COVID-19 death rates by country
- List of deaths due to COVID-19, for a list of notable people who have died from COVID-19
