= COVID-19 pandemic in Saint Martin =

COVID-19 pandemic in Saint Martin may refer to:

- COVID-19 pandemic in the Collectivity of Saint Martin, the French part of the island
- COVID-19 pandemic in Sint Maarten, the Dutch part of the island
