= Sylvie Feucher =

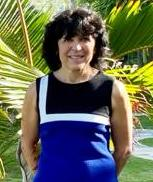
- Feucher in 2020

Prefect of Saint-Martin and Saint-Barthélemy
- In office 18 June 2018 – 25 December 2020
- Preceded by: Anne Laubiès
- Succeeded by: Serge Gouteyron

Personal details
- Born: 26 February 1959 (age 67) Brest, France

Sylvie Feucher (née Daniélo; born 26 February 1959) is a French civil servant. A former police inspector, Feucher became Chief Commissioner of the National Police in Versailles, served as Secretary General of the Union of National Police Commissioners (SCPN) and was the Prefect of Saint-Martin and Saint-Barthélemy from 2018 until 2020 and of Ariège from 2020 to 2023.

== Early life ==
Feucher, née Daniélo, was born on 26 February 1959 in Brest, Brittany, France. Her father worked in the navy.

== Policing ==
She began her career with the Central Directorate of the Judicial Police in Paris.

From 2002 to 2004, she was the Chief Commissioner and Head of District at Poissy Police Station.

In 2004, Feucher became Chief Commissioner of the National Police in Versailles. First serving as Depute Secretary General, Feucher was then Secretary General of Union of National Police Commissioners (SCPN) from 2008 to 2012.

== Civil service ==
In 2013 Feucher became the Prefect for Equal Opportunities in Val-d'Oise.

On 18 June 2018, Feucher was appointed Prefect of Saint-Martin and Saint-Barthélemy. The islands used to be part of Guadeloupe, however on 7 February 2007 they became an overseas collectivity with a Prefect for both islands to represent the State, but also to handle the non-military aspect of crises. Sylvie Feucher was therefore in charge of the management of the 2020 coronavirus pandemic in French Saint Martin and Saint Barthélemy. Feucher served until 25 December 2020.

On 26 November 2020, the Council of Ministers announced the appointment of Feucher as Prefect of Ariège
