= COVID-19 pandemic in Sint Maarten =

Ongoing COVID-19 viral pandemic in Sint Maarten

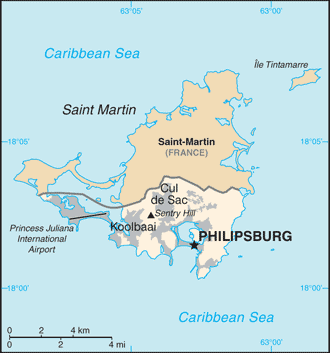
- Disease: COVID-19
- Pathogen: SARS-CoV-2
- Location: Sint Maarten
- Arrival date: 17 March 2020 (6 years, 5 months and 5 days)
- Confirmed cases: 9,599 (2022-03-09)
- Active cases: 51
- Recovered: 9,463
- Deaths: 85

Government website
- sintmaartengov.org

The COVID-19 pandemic in Sint Maarten, also known as the coronavirus disease 2019 pandemic in Sint Maarten, was a part of the ongoing viral pandemic of coronavirus disease 2019 (COVID-19), which was confirmed to have reached the Dutch Caribbean island of Sint Maarten on 17 March 2020. By 15 June, all cases recovered. On 1 July, a new case had been discovered, which resolved on 3 July On 15 July, a 79th case was discovered.

The island is split in a Dutch and French part, with the main airport on the Dutch side and the major harbour on the Dutch side. The first positive test was a French couple from Saint Martin who returned from France via Saint Barthélemy on 1 March 2020. They were screened and tested positive on the airport, but are counted on the French count. The island had a population of 41,486 people in 2016.

== Background ==
On 12 January 2020, the World Health Organization (WHO) confirmed that a novel coronavirus was the cause of a respiratory illness in a cluster of people in Wuhan City, Hubei Province, China, which was reported to the WHO on 31 December 2019.

The case fatality ratio for COVID-19 has been much lower than SARS of 2003, but the transmission has been significantly greater, with a significant total death toll.

== Timeline ==
Cases

Deaths

=== March ===
Travel restrictions which were issued by the Government of Sint Maarten were increased from 14 to 21 days as ordered by Prime Minister Silveria Jacobs on 11 March 2020. Sunday, 22 March 2020 at 11:59 pm was the last day for residents (passengers) of St. Maarten to travel back to St. Maarten. After 22 March 2020 the only flights coming into PJIAE airport would be cargo flights or flights that are coming in to pick up passengers to return them to their home address.

A decision was made on 12 March 2020 to postpone Carnival 2020 after emergency meetings were held with the Emergency Operations Center (EOC) and Members of Parliament. The decision to postpone Carnival was taken in keeping with the WHO recommendations which advises persons to avoid large crowds.
The Sint Maarten government denied the MS Braemar the right to dock and evacuate the passengers, because several passenger had been diagnosed positive by the health authorities of Canada and Curaçao.

On 17 March 2020, the first positive case in Sint Maarten was confirmed. A local male resident who had recently traveled to the United Kingdom (UK) via Miami was registered as the country's first Coronavirus COVID-19 case on Tuesday, 17 March 2020 by the Prime Minister and EOC chair-person Silveria Jacobs. To further mitigate the spread of COVID-19 all schools and non-essential businesses were shut down for 14 days On 18 March 2020 at 12:00 am.

On 22 March 2020, there were 2 confirmed cases on St Maarten. The second case is a student who had returned from abroad.

On 24 March 2020, Prime Minister Silveria Jacobs announced that the number of coronavirus COVID-19 cases had risen to 6, of which 2 were hospitalized.

On 29 March 2020, a decision was made by the Government of St Maarten to increase further restrictions on the movement of persons throughout the island via a Ministerial Regulation. This regulation requires citizens to carry a document on them, signed by their employer, declaring the need for them to travel to work (Form A), or one which describes which essential service they are traveling to or for (Form B).

On 30 March 2020, a curfew from 8:00 pm to 6:00 am was implemented for the remainder of the COVID-19 period. The border between Sint Maarten and Saint Martin is closed and jointly patrolled with the French government. The border had been open since the Treaty of Concordia of 1648.

On 31 March 2020, a further 10 positive cases were confirmed, bringing the total number of cases to 16. St Maarten recorded its first death from the disease that same day. The person was at the time of death a suspected case in isolation at home. In total, 58 persons were tested with 16 testing positive, and 36 testing negative.

=== April ===
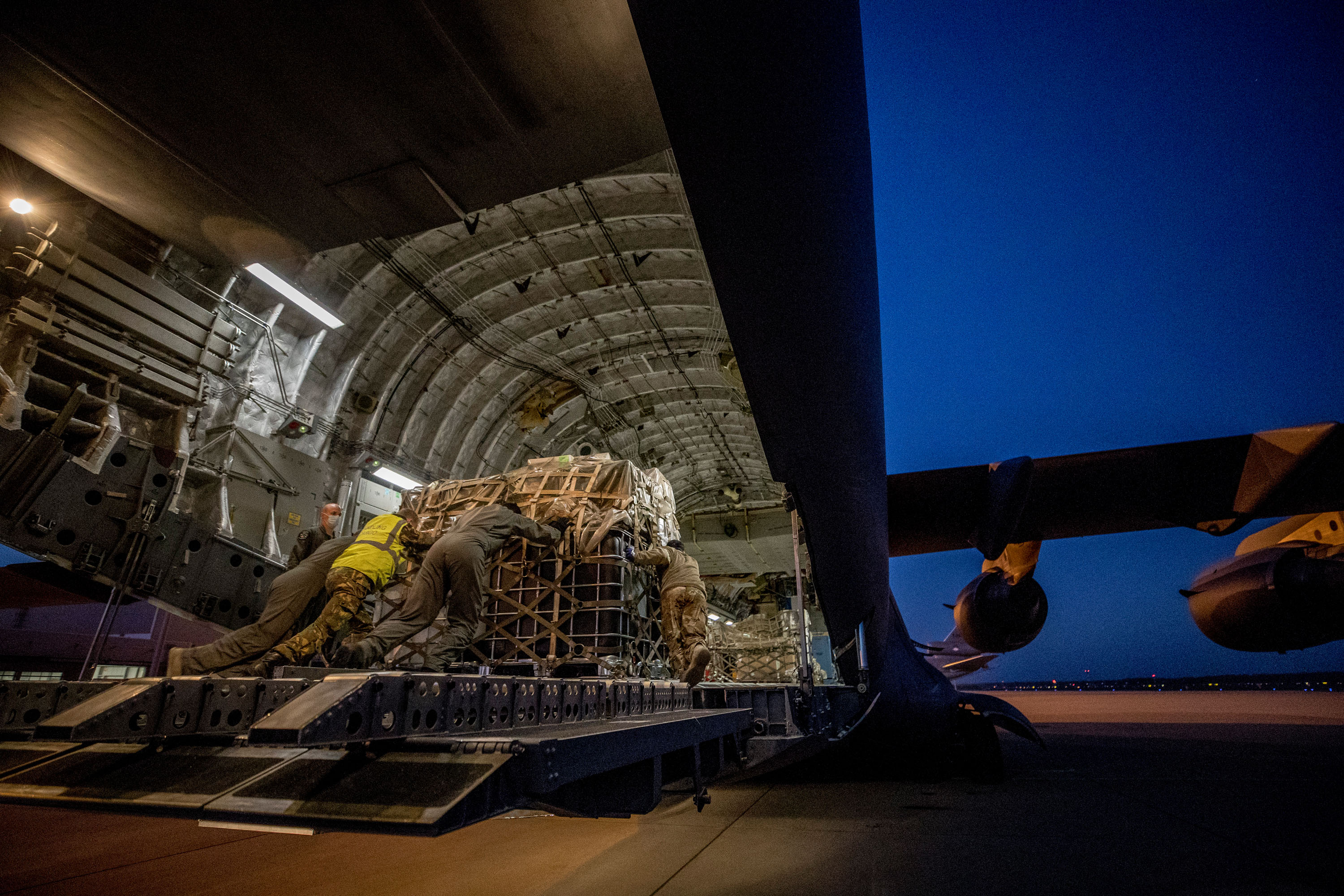
Medical shipment to Sint Maarten

On 2 April 2020, the total numbers of COVID-19 cases rose to 23, of which 18 were male, 5 were female. 3 cases were currently hospitalized, and 1 new death was recorded bringing the total number of deaths to two. The additional death listed succumbed at St. Maarten Medical Center (SMMC) on Thursday, 2 April.
Health Care Laboratory Sint Maarten and the laboratory in Cole Bay now have the ability to test for COVID-19, but they only have a limited amount of kits, therefore tests of people without symptoms are often forwarded to Guadelope which will take 3 to 5 days.

On 3 April 2020, the number of deaths climbed to four when two more persons died. Between 31 March 2020 and 3 April 2020 four persons have died from the illness in four days. Collective Prevention Services (CPS) head epidemiologist Eva Lista-de Weever, who confirmed the two additional deaths, said the total number of confirmed cases still stands at 23 as of 3 April 2020. Prime Minister and Emergency Operations Center (EOC) Chairperson Silveria Jacobs said a total shutdown is being planned due to the trend of increasing COVID-19 fatalities. A National Decree regarding the curfew has been prepared and was sent to Governor Eugene Holiday. The date of the total shutdown is awaiting confirmation of the decree.

On 5 April 2020, a total lock-down went into effect. Nobody is allowed to leave their house for the coming two weeks. The lock-down which was announced on 4 April, caused long queues at the supermarket. It was later announced that supermarkets are allowed to deliver.
Respirators, medical supplies, and six ICU beds were flown to Sint Maarten by the Dutch government. Sint Maarten was considered the hardest hit island and therefore received the supplies five days before the other islands.

On 6 April 2020, the government came under scrutiny. Melissa Gumbs and Raeyhon Peterson of Party For Progress criticised the haphazard announcement one day before the total lock-down came into effect, and the exclusion of Parliament in this decision.
The minor roads were physically blocked to prevent border crossings.

As a 15 April 2020, there were 91 people in self-quarantine and 161 in self-isolation. 161 people were tested of which 53 tested positive (35 males and 18 females). Nine people have died and five have recovered.

On 16 April 2020, Egbert Doran, Minister of Public Housing, Spatial Planning, Environment and Infrastructure, asked all the flags to be flown half-mast and observe a day of mourning.

On 17 April 2020, the total lock-down was ended causing long lines at the supermarkets.

On 19 April 2020, Prime Minister Silveria Jacobs announced that the tenth and most recent death was a Dutch citizen who was being treated on the French side. Last week he was flown to Guadelope for critical care, however as Dutch citizen he will be removed from the French Saint Martin count and added to the Dutch Sint Maarten count.

On 20 April 2020, Prime Minister Jacobs announced that nine people had been found with flu-like symptoms, but that only six consented to be tested. These are the preliminary figures of the Ministry of Health going door to door to find suspected cases.

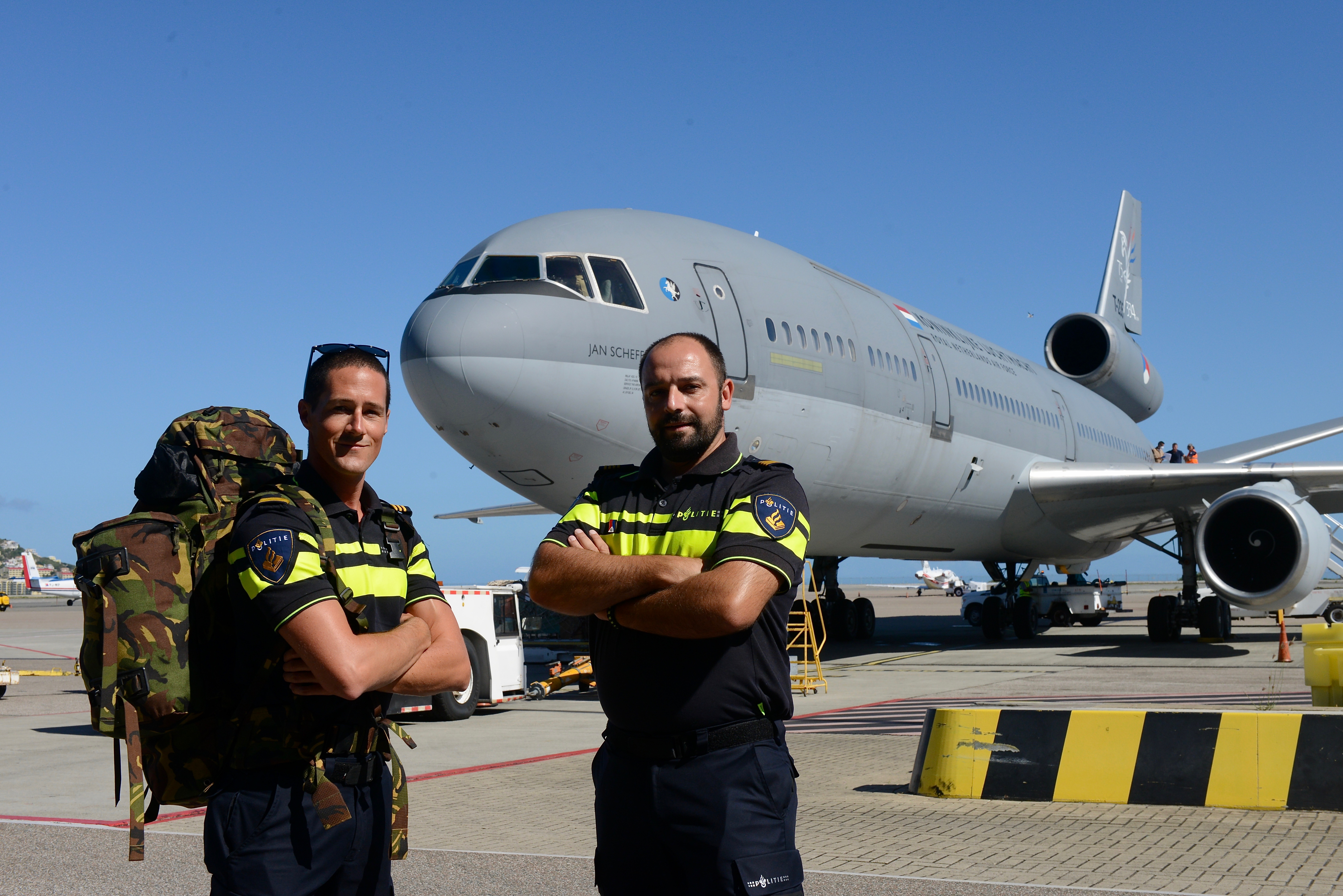
27 April: additional police arrived in St.Maarten

On 24 April 2020, Jacobs announced that there were three health care workers among the recent updates. There were no new cases reported on 23 April, because the test results were still pending. 900 additional test kits had been received.
The Zr. Ms. Karel Doorman which was dispatched from Den Helder on 13 April to assist with food aid, border control and public order, has arrived in Sint Maarten. The Netherlands, France and United Kingdom will jointly patrol the waters of the Caribbean.

On 27 April 2020, the Sint Maarten government allocated NAf 4.7 million ($2.4M) for additional healthcare of which NAf 450,000 is for testing (~$0.25M) in its 2020 budget. The hospital which has been suffering from a decrease in its cash flow will get an additional NAf. 17.8 million.

On 30 April 2020, Prime Minister Silveria Jacobs announced that Sint Maarten will start rapid testing. The test kits will have a 98% accuracy.

=== May ===
On 5 May 2020, Prime Minister Jacobs announced that the fourteenth death which was reported had occurred on 24 April but had not been counted. Jacobs apologised for the mistake.

On 6 May 2020, the Council of Ministers decided to reduce their salaries by 20%.

On 7 May 2020, Prime Minister Jacobs announced that the State of Emergency will be lifted on 17 May. The details will be announced, and businesses who wish to reopen have to submit a plan which has to be approved. The night curfew will remain in effect.

On 12 May 2020, the Health Ministry's Collective Prevention Services had screened 5,132 residents up to now. Only one case had been found. Five people refused to be tested, but have been quarantined.

Prime Minister Silveria Jacobs announced that the Dutch side wanted to reopen the borders on 18 May. President Daniel Gibbs of the French side wanted a reopening as well, however Prefect Sylvie Feucher wanted to keep the borders closed for now. It is now up to the French government to decide whether the internal borders will reopen. The internal border will be reopened on 2 June.

=== June ===
As of 6 June 2020, Catholic mass will commence. The number of people allowed depends on the size of the church. People under 12 and over 70 should are requested to stay at home.

On 15 June 2020 all cases recovered.

=== July ===
On 1 July 2020, a new case had been discovered.

On 3 July 2020, the case resolved again.

On 15 July 2020, a 79th case was discovered.

On 30 July 2020, Ludmila de Weever, minister of Tourism, announced that the border opening for passengers from the United States is still 1 August as scheduled. This has resulted in a response by Sylvie Feucher, Préfète Délguée of French Saint Martin who announced that Americans are not allowed on their side of the island, and the French-Dutch border will be closed to prevent circulation of the virus.

== Preventive measures ==
On 17 March, the airport and ports are closed for passengers. This does not apply to residents of Sint Maarten who have to quarantine for 14 days, and essential travel from Saba, Sint-Eustatius, and Curaçao. All schools are closed.

On 20 March 2020, a list of maximum prices for some essential goods was published.

On 29 March, everybody should stay at home except when they have a special permission to travel. The border between Sint Maarten and Saint Martin is closed and jointly patrolled with the French government. Restaurants are take-away only and are not allowed to sell alcoholic beverages. The alcohol ban was lifted on 15 April.

On 30 March, a curfew was implemented from 20:00 until 6:00.

On 5 April 2020, a total lock-down was announced. Nobody is allowed to leave their house for the coming two weeks. The lock-down ended on 17 April 2020.

On 21 April 2020, the post office reopened for three days a week in the morning.

== Transition to endemic phase ==
On 21 February 2022, the Minister of Public Health Omar Ottley announced that Sint Maarten will begin transitioning into the endemic phase of COVID-19 with the extending of night life business hours and revised travel restrictions.

== Statistics ==
=== Third wave ===
Chronology of the number of active cases

=== Second wave ===
Chronology of the number of active cases

=== First wave ===
Chronology of the number of active cases

== See also ==
- COVID-19 pandemic in Anguilla
- COVID-19 pandemic in French Saint Martin
- COVID-19 pandemic in Saba
- Caribbean Public Health Agency
- COVID-19 pandemic in North America
- COVID-19 pandemic by country and territory
