= COVID-19 pandemic in Saint Barthélemy =

Ongoing COVID-19 viral pandemic in Saint Barthélemy, France

- Disease: COVID-19
- Pathogen: SARS-CoV-2
- Location: Saint Barthélemy
- Arrival date: 1 March 2020 (6 years, 2 months, 2 weeks and 3 days)
- Confirmed cases: 5,507
- Recovered: 5,472
- Deaths: 5

Government website
- guadeloupe.ars.sante.fr

The COVID-19 pandemic in Saint Barthélemy was a part of the ongoing global viral pandemic of coronavirus disease 2019 (COVID-19), which was confirmed to have reached the French overseas collectivity of Saint Barthélemy on 1 March 2020. The last positive case was on 31 March 2020. On 21 April, the last case recovered. Between 18 and 24 July, a new case was imported.

== Background ==
On 12 January 2020, the World Health Organization (WHO) confirmed that a novel coronavirus was the cause of a respiratory illness in a cluster of people in Wuhan City, Hubei Province, China, which was reported to the WHO on 31 December 2019.

The case fatality ratio for COVID-19 has been much lower than SARS of 2003, but the transmission has been significantly greater, with a significant total death toll.

Saint Barthélemy is a small island with a population of 9,793 people The island has a small hospital (Hôpital de Bruyn), however testing for COVID-19 and specialized health care has to be performed in Guadeloupe. As an overseas collectivity crises are handled by the Prefect. The island can start testing locally in early May.

== Timeline ==
Cases

Deaths

=== March 2020 ===
A resident of the French island of Saint Barthélemy was diagnosed with COVID-19 on 1 March. His parents on the neighbouring island of Saint Martin also tested positive.

Three cases of the coronavirus (COVID-19) were confirmed in the French island of St. Barthélemy (St. Barts) and French Saint Martin on 1 March. The cases were confirmed by the Institut Pasteur Laboratory of Guadeloupe which is conducting tests for the virus. The case involves a resident of St. Barthélemy and his visiting relatives. The person was confined at home in St. Barthélemy and under daily surveillance while his parents are isolated in the Louis-Constant Fleming Hospital in French Saint Martin. The couple had come from Paris, France, to visit their son, who lives in Saint-Barthélemy.

On 24 March, the confinement orders have been strengthened: people may only leave their house for essential travel; markets are closed; gatherings are forbidden; non-essential businesses should close.

=== April 2020 ===
On 16 April, after two weeks without new cases, swimming was again authorized on the beaches of the island.

The last case on the island was declared cured on 21 April.

As of 23 April, the Pasteur Institute in Guadeloupe have analysed 84 tests from Saint Barthélemy. Special monitoring is carried out at retirement homes (EHPAD), however no cases have been reported for the island.

On 24 April, Air Caraïbes announced that flights between Saint Martin (Grand Case-Espérance Airport not Princess Juliana International Airport), Saint Barthélemy, and Gaudeloupe will be resuming as of today.

On 30 April, Bruno Magras, president of the collectivity, announce that all services, including schools, restaurants, bars, sport and cultural activities will reopen on 11 May.

=== May 2020 ===
On 2 May, the Collectivity announced the arrival of local testing equipment, and will be able to test up to 16 tests per hour to prepare for deconfinement and a return of the virus. €2 million has been allocated for testing since April.

On 9 May, an amendment of Michel Magras, Senator of Saint Barthélemy, to limit the quarantine to people who had tested positive, in order to resume tourism, failed to pass.

== Preventive measures ==
- The airport and port are closed. Local flights have been allowed again since 24 April.
- All restaurants and bars were closed, all schools were closed, and all gatherings were banned. Until 11 May when President Bruno Magras allowed their reopening.
- All non-essential businesses are closed.
- It is prohibited to leave the house except for essential journeys.
- The restriction of visits to the beach and swimming have been repealed as of 16 April.
- From 11 May onwards, schools, businesses, restaurants, bars will reopen as long as they abide to social distancing.

== Statistics ==
=== Second wave ===
Chronology of the number of active cases

=== First wave ===
Chronology of the number of active cases

== See also ==
- COVID-19 pandemic in French Saint Martin
- COVID-19 pandemic in Guadeloupe
- COVID-19 pandemic in North America
- COVID-19 pandemic by country and territory
