= COVID-19 pandemic in the Turks and Caicos Islands =

Ongoing COVID-19 viral pandemic in Turks and Caicos Islands

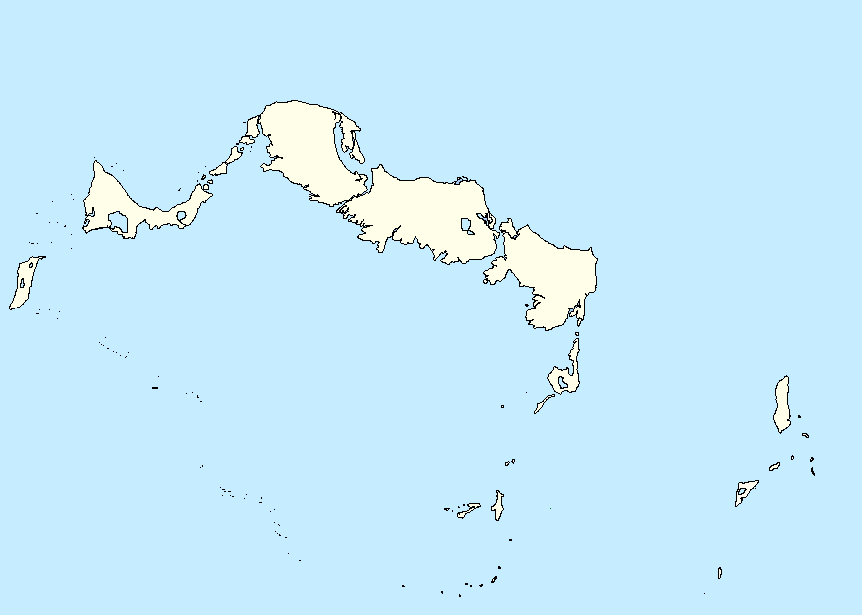
- Disease: COVID-19
- Pathogen: SARS-CoV-2
- Location: Turks and Caicos Islands
- First outbreak: Wuhan, Hubei, China
- Arrival date: 23 March 2020 (6 years, 4 months, 4 weeks and 2 days)
- Confirmed cases: 2,568 (2021-08-17)
- Active cases: 54
- Recovered: 2,495
- Deaths: 23

Government website
- gov.tc

The COVID-19 pandemic in the Turks and Caicos Islands is part of the ongoing global viral pandemic of coronavirus disease 2019 (COVID-19), which was confirmed to have reached the British Overseas Territory of the Turks and Caicos Islands on 23 March 2020, and the first death occurred on 5 April. On 12 May, all cases were declared resolved, but on 20 June, new cases had been discovered. On 4 July 2021, all cases resolved again. On 8 July, new cases were discovered.

== Background ==
On 12 January 2020, the World Health Organization (WHO) confirmed that a novel coronavirus was the cause of a respiratory illness in a cluster of people in Wuhan City, Hubei Province, China, which was reported to the WHO on 31 December 2019.

The case fatality rate for COVID-19 has been much lower than SARS of 2003, but the transmission has been significantly greater, with a significant total death toll. From 19 March, Public Health England no longer classified COVID-19 as a "High consequence infectious disease".

== Timeline ==
Cases

Deaths

=== March 2020 ===
On 23 March, the first case in the Turks and Caicos Islands was confirmed.

On 27 March, The Royal Turks and Caicos Islands Police Force issued a mandatory stay at home order and curfew. Violators of the order were subject to fines, imprisonment and confiscation of vehicles.

=== April 2020 ===
On 5 April, the first death due to COVID-19 had been announced. It was a middle-aged man who had recently travelled to the United States.

On 17 April, the United Kingdom send medical supplies to the Turk and Caicos Islands in three batches.

On 18 April, a patient transferred from the Turks and Caicos Islands to Jamaica for advanced critical care tested positive for COVID-19.

On 24 April, it was announced that the Turks and Caicos Islands now have the ability to test for COVID-19 locally and will commence widespread testing. Up to now the samples were forwarded to the Caribbean Public Health Agency.

=== May 2020 ===
On 1 May, residents which are struggling to make ends meet will receive $200 food vouchers for a period of three months.

On 12 May, the number of active cases was zero. One person left the country which accounts for the math.

As of 14 May, there were no active cases. However, 54 people were in quarantine or under observation, with five suspected cases.

=== June 2020 ===
On 20 June, two new cases had been discovered. One case was a quarantined resident who had returned to the island, the second had been in contact with the aforementioned person.

On 25 June, two cases of community spread had been discovered on the island.

On 29 June, an elderly man with underlying health conditions died from COVID-19.

== Preventive measures ==
- All schools have been shut for a month.
- The Ministry of Health also enacted section 18 of the Emergency Powers (COVID-19) Regulations 2020, making it a criminal offence to spread or disseminate unverified or false information about the virus, whether the direct source of the information or not.
- Cruise ships have been banned with the only port on the island of Grand Turk shut down until 30 June.
- All airports, seaports, beaches, schools, restaurants and other businesses are closed until 4 May. This was extended until 22 July.
- Wearing of face masks is mandatory.
- Starting on 27 March, the Turks and Caicos Islands will be under full lock down for three weeks. The lock down will end on 4 May and a phased reopening will commence. Curfew had ended on 22 June.

== Statistics ==
=== Third wave ===
Chronology of the number of active cases

=== Second wave ===
Chronology of the number of active cases

=== First wave ===
Chronology of the number of active cases

== See also ==
- Caribbean Public Health Agency
- COVID-19 pandemic in North America
- COVID-19 pandemic by country and territory
