= COVID-19 pandemic in Guadeloupe =

Ongoing COVID-19 viral pandemic in Guadeloupe, France

- Disease: COVID-19
- Pathogen: SARS-CoV-2
- Location: Guadeloupe
- Arrival date: 13 March 2020 (6 years, 4 months and 2 weeks)
- Confirmed cases: 203,235
- Recovered: 201,148
- Deaths: 1,021
- Fatality rate: 0.56%

Government website
- https://www.guadeloupe.ars.sante.fr/

The COVID-19 pandemic in Guadeloupe was a part of the ongoing global viral pandemic of coronavirus disease 2019 (COVID-19), which was confirmed to have spread to the French overseas department and region of Guadeloupe on 12 March 2020.

== Background ==
On 12 January 2020, the World Health Organization (WHO) confirmed that a novel coronavirus was the cause of a respiratory illness in a cluster of people in Wuhan City, Hubei Province, China, which was reported to the WHO on 31 December 2019.

The case fatality ratio for COVID-19 has been much lower than SARS of 2003, but the transmission has been significantly greater, with a significant total death toll.

== Timeline ==
Cases

Deaths

On 12 March, the first case of COVID-19 in Guadeloupe was confirmed.

As of 16 March, there had been 6 positive cases and no deaths. By 26 March, there had been 84 positive cases and 1 death.

On 21 August, Valérie Denux, director of the Regional Health Agency of Guadeloupe (ARS), announced the archipelago alert threshold was crossed, with an incidence rate of 86.23, per 100,000 inhabitants; doubling in the previous week. A scheduled meeting was scheduled to take place on 25 August, to announce monitoring activity by the COVID-19 committee as well as plans by local authorities on educational institution reopening plans.

== Preventive measures ==
- As of 13 August, face masks must be worn in all indoor spaces for people over the age of 11, but the rule has not been extended to outdoor public spaces.
- Recommendation that large gatherings be avoided, Unauthorized events are subject to fines of €135.

== See also ==
- COVID-19 pandemic
- COVID-19 pandemic by country and territory
- COVID-19 pandemic in South America
