= COVID-19 pandemic in the Comoros =

Ongoing COVID-19 viral pandemic in the Comoros

- Disease: COVID-19
- Pathogen: SARS-CoV-2
- Location: Comoros
- First outbreak: Wuhan, China
- Index case: Moroni
- Arrival date: 23 April 2020 (Note: The patient had been hospitalized one week before diagnosis) (6 years, 3 months, 4 weeks and 2 days)
- Confirmed cases: 9,109 (as of December 2023)
- Recovered: 3,059
- Deaths: 142

Government website
- stopcoronavirus.km

The COVID-19 pandemic was confirmed to have reached the Comoros on 30 April 2020, and by 4 May the first death was announced.

== Background ==
On 12 January 2020, the World Health Organization (WHO) confirmed that a novel coronavirus was the cause of a respiratory illness in a cluster of people in Wuhan City, Hubei Province, China, which was reported to the WHO on 31 December 2019.

The case fatality ratio for COVID-19 has been much lower than SARS of 2003, but the transmission has been significantly greater, with a significant total death toll. Model-based simulations for the Comoros indicate that the 95% confidence interval for the time-varying reproduction number R_{t} was stable below 1.0 from June to August 2020.

== Timeline ==
=== April 2020 ===
As a preventative measure, arriving travellers were to be quarantined for 14 days upon arrival. In order to prevent the spread of the virus, the government has cancelled all incoming flights and banned large gatherings.

On 15 April, a person arriving in Mayotte from the Comoros tested positive for COVID-19.

On 16 April, Dominique Voynet, Director of Mayotte Regional Health Agency, announced that a person who died on 8 April before being evacuated to Mayotte on the basis of an x-ray of COVID-19 was Said Toihir, the Grand Mufti of the Comoros. The announcement caused a diplomatic rift between Comoros and France. Mohamed El-Amine Souef, Foreign Minister of Comoros said "If a case is confirmed in the Comoros, it is not Dominique Voynet to announce it, we have been independent since 6 July 1975."

On 17 April, the World Health Organization delivered medical aid to the Comoros.

On 20 April, the rapper Cheikh Mc released a video saying that his wife had been infected by COVID-19. The rapper was arrested by the gendarmerie at 16:00 after the video was shared many times. Cheikh Mc had been released again around 21:00. The Ministry of Health announced on 21 April that Cheikh Mc's fears could not be confirmed without testing, but the contacts of his wife will be followed up.

On 22 April, a polymerase chain reaction (PCR) screening machine was delivered and the Comoros can start testing for COVID-19 from 23 April onwards.

On 30 April, the first case was confirmed, a 50-year-old man who was admitted to the El-Maarouf hospital in Moroni on 23 April. The patient had been in contact with a Franco-Comorian national on 18 March. On 2 May, Ibrahim Djabir, Head of the emergency department of the El-Maarouf hospital, said that his condition is improving, but he is still on oxygen. The protocol for mild cases who do not require hospitalisation is being studied, but they will probably receive Artequick in tablet. President Azali Assoumani also disclosed that a curfew had been instituted.

=== May 2020 ===
On 2 May, it was announced that two more cases had tested positive. All cases are on the island of Grande Comore.
There was a video conference between President Assoumani and President Rajoelina of Madagascar. Madagascar will send medical aid to the Comoros.

On 4 May, the first death was announced.

On 6 May, President Azali Assoumani announced that total confinement is not an option for the islands. A donation of 100,000 face masks had been received, and India will be sending medical supplies and doctors to support the local health care.

There are now eight cases, five of which are on Grande Comore and three on Mohéli. 54 people had been tested, and 53 contacts had been traced.

On 8 May, UNICEF donated 5 ventilators to the Ministry of Health. Comoros had nearly 25 ventilators on the three islands.

On 13 May, the United Nations donated 1,000 rapid tests to the Ministry of Health.

On 16 May, the first repatriation flight arrived from Tanzania with 134 people on board. 70 people returned from Kenya, and on 17 May two more flights will arrive from Tanzania.

On 19 May, the virus had been confirmed on Anjouan (Ngazidja), and is now active on all major islands.

On 21 May, the Grand Mufti requested that the people celebrate Eid al-Fitr at home in these exceptional times.

In May there were 105 new cases, bringing the total number of confirmed cases to 106. The death toll was 2. 26 patients recovered, leaving 78 active cases at the end of the month.

=== June 2020 ===
During the month there were 197 new cases, bringing the total number of confirmed cases to 303. The death toll rose to 7. The number of recovered patients rose by 174 to 200, leaving 96 active cases at the end of the month (23% more than at the end of May).

=== July to December 2020 ===
On 8 July, the President made wearing face masks outdoors mandatory on the whole territory.

On 21 July, the island of Mohéli no longer had active COVID-19 cases.

There were 83 new cases in July, 37 in August, 55 in September, 67 in October, 66 in November, and 212 in December. The total number of cases stood at 386 in July, 423 in August, 478 in September, 545 in October, 611 in November, and 823 in December.

The number of recovered patients stood at 330 in July, 458 in September, 498 in October, 586 in November, and 705 in December, leaving 49 active cases at the end of July, 17 at the end of August, 13 at the end of September, 40 at the end of October, 18 at the end of November, and 108 at the end of December.

In December 2020, the death toll rose to 10.

=== January to December 2021 ===
The first cases of the 501.V2 variant were confirmed on 23 January.

In March, the government received 100,000 doses of the Sinopharm vaccine from China.

On 10 April 2021, president Azali Assoumani, his wife Ambari and several other public figures received the first dose of the Sinopharm vaccine in Moroni to mark the start of Comoros' vaccination programme.

There were 1903 new cases in January, 845 in February, 125 in March, 138 in April, 115 in May, 64 in June, 15 in July, 37 in August, 76 in September, 125 in October, 242 in November, and 2180 in December. The total number of cases stood at 2726 in January, 3571 in February, 3696 in March, 3834 in April, 3949 in May, 4013 in June, 4028 in July, 4065 in August, 4141 in September, 4266 in October, 4508 in November, and 6688 in December.

The number of recovered patients stood at 1731 in January, 3314 in February, 3525 in March, 3684 in April, 3719 in May, 3869 in July, 3901 in August, 3963 in September, 4070 in October, 4298 in November, and 4798 in December, leaving 902 active cases at the end of January, 113 at the end of February, 25 at the end of March, 14 at the end of April, 16 at the end of May, 12 at the end of July, 17 at the end of August, 31 at the end of September, 49 at the end of October, 60 at the end of November, and 1733 at the end of December.

The death toll rose to 93 in January, 144 in February, 146 in March, 147 in July, 150 in November, and 157 in December.

By the end of April, 43,104 persons had received their first inoculation. By the end of May, 83,907 vaccine doses had been administered.

Modeling carried out by the WHO's Regional Office for Africa suggests that due to under-reporting, the true cumulative number of infections by the end of 2021 was around 394,000 while the true number of COVID-19 deaths was around 333.

=== January to December 2022 ===
There were 1144 new cases in January, 201 in February, 55 in March, 18 in April, 14 in May, 19 in June, 176 in July, 140 in August, 16 in September, 291 in October, 203 in November and 17 in December. The total number of cases stood at 7832 in January, 8033 in February, 8088 in March, 8106 in April, 8120 in May, 8139 in June, 8315 in July, 8455 in August, 8471 in September, 8762 in October, 8965 in November and 8982 in December.

The number of recovered patients stood at 7648 in January, 7855 in February, 7920 in March, 7945 in April, 8124 in July, 8281 in August, 8305 in September, 8421 in October, and 8819 in December, leaving 24 active cases at the end of January, 18 at the end of February, 8 at the end of March, 1 at the end of April, 31 at the end of July, 13 at the end of August, 5 at the end of September, 180 at the end of October, and 2 at the end of December.

The death toll rose to 160 in January and 161 in August.

=== 2023 ===
There were 127 confirmed cases in 2023, bringing the total number of cases to 9,109. The death toll remained unchanged.

== Preventive measures ==
- All schools have been closed.
- Arriving travellers are quarantined for 14 days.
- Incoming flights are banned.
- Large gatherings are banned.
- Curfew has been instituted between 20:00 to 05:00 as of 25 April.

== Statistics ==
=== Active cases per day ===
No data reports from 12 August until 1 September.

Chronology of the number of active cases for all islands:

Chronology of the number of active cases in Grand Comore:

Chronology of the number of active cases in Mohéli:

Chronology of the number of active cases in Anjouan:

Source: stopcoronavirus.km

== See also ==
- COVID-19 pandemic in Africa
- COVID-19 pandemic by country and territory
- COVID-19 pandemic in Mayotte
- COVID-19 vaccination in the Comoros
