= COVID-19 pandemic in Mayotte =

Ongoing COVID-19 viral pandemic in Mayotte, France

- Disease: COVID-19
- Pathogen: SARS-CoV-2
- Location: Mayotte
- First outbreak: Wuhan, Hubei, China via France
- Arrival date: 13 March 2020 (6 years, 5 months, 3 weeks and 4 days)
- Confirmed cases: 42,004
- Recovered: 41,816
- Deaths: 188

Government website
- mayotte.gouv.fr

The COVID-19 pandemic was confirmed to have reached the French overseas department and region of Mayotte on 10 March 2020. On 31 March, the first person died of COVID-19. In late April, the virus was out of control, and actively circulating on the island. On 16 August, Mayotte has been green listed.

== Background ==
On 12 January 2020, the World Health Organization (WHO) confirmed that a novel coronavirus was the cause of a respiratory illness in a cluster of people in Wuhan City, Hubei Province, China, which was reported to the WHO on 31 December 2019.

The case fatality ratio for COVID-19 has been much lower than SARS of 2003, but the transmission has been significantly greater, with a significant total death toll.

== Timeline ==
=== March 2020 ===
- A man from the department of Oise, France, arrived in Mayotte on 10 March. He had suspicious flu-like symptoms, and was observed for three days in a hospital. On 13 March, the man tested positive for COVID-19.
- On 17 March, a third case, also a traveler, was identified. The island later entered lockdown, as was the case with metropolitan France. With a single hospital center for a population of 263,000 inhabitants and precarious living conditions (84% live below the poverty line), there is great concern. As in Réunion, the island is also affected by dengue fever.
- On 18 March, the authorities set up a health control system at Dzaoudzi airport, with volunteer school nurses.
- On 23 March, French National Assembly member Mansour Kamardine was very concerned and arranged 69 additional hospital beds to be shipped to Mayotte, because there were only 16 ICU beds.
- A curfew was instituted between 20:00 and 05:00. Gatherings with more than two people were banned. Traffic restrictions applied throughout the island.
- On 31 March, Mayotte recorded its first death. By that date, 101 cases had been confirmed and ten patients had recovered, leaving 90 active cases.

=== April 2020 ===
- On 1 April, the bar of 100 cases was exceeded.
- On 3 April, MP Mansour Kamardine was hospitalized and tested positive for COVID-19; he was infected locally.
- On 4 April, an air bridge was set up between Réunion and Mayotte to supply the island with sanitary and food products and if needed health workers.

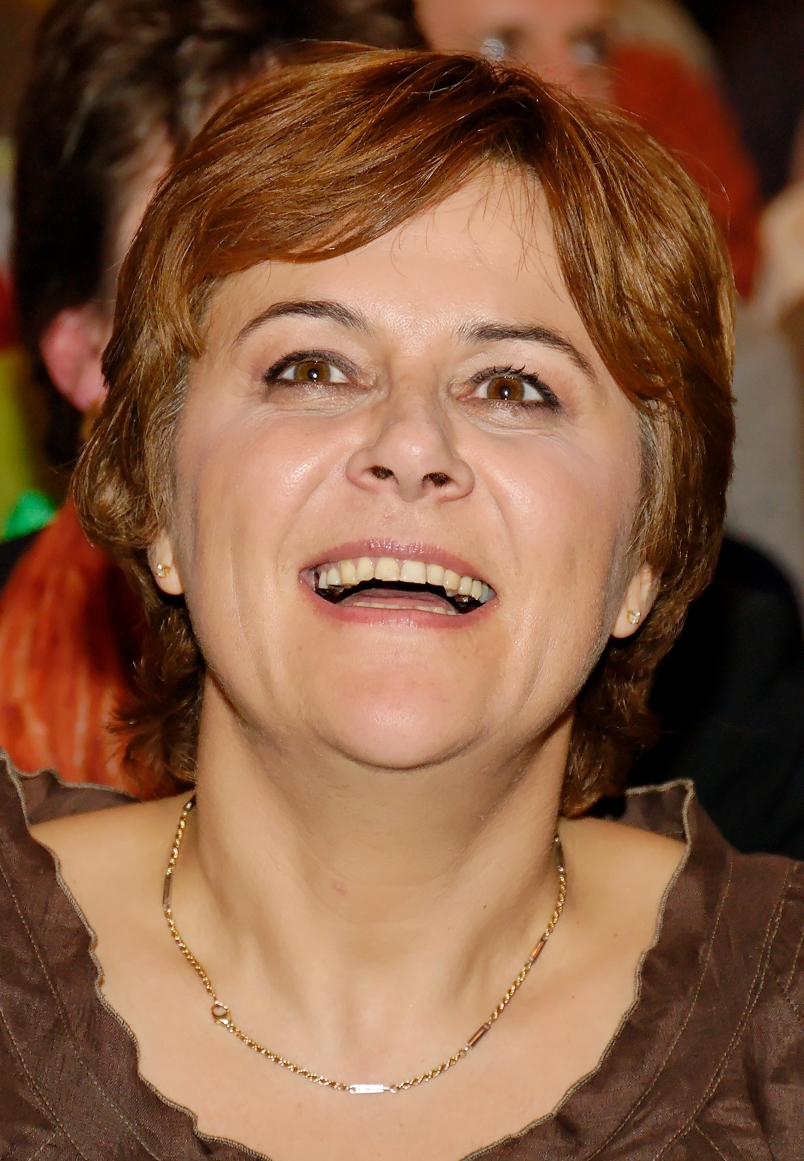
Dominique Voynet, Director of Mayotte Regional Health Agency during the 2020 pandemic

- On 8 April, a second death related to COVID-19 is announced; just as in the first case, the person presented with aggravating pathologies. On 16 April, Dominique Voynet, Director of Mayotte Regional Health Agency, announced that a person from the Comoros who died on 8 April before being evacuated to Mayotte on the basis of an x-ray of was Said Toihir, the Grand Mufti of the Comoros. The announcement caused a diplomatic rift between Comoros and France. Mohamed El-Amine Souef, Foreign Minister of Comoros said "If a case is confirmed in the Comoros, it is not Dominique Voynet to announce it, we have been independent since 6 July 1975." On 30 April, Comoros announced its first case.
- On 10 April, the ARS announced 191 cases, including 41 health professionals; 17 people are hospitalized, including 4 in intensive care; 50 patients are recovered.
- The report of the Scientific Council on the Evolution of the Coronavirus in the Overseas Territories has been released which calls for strict confinement, doubling of hospital capacity. The situation in Mayotte is considered worrying and therefore calls for an "extra-hospital" structure to isolate the asymptomatic cases.
- On 11 April, a third death was declared; the number of cases increased slightly to 196.
- On 12 April, there were 203 confirmed cases. 67 people have recovered, and more than 1,400 tests have been performed thus far.
- On 13 April, there were 207 confirmed cases including 42 health workers.
- On 14 April, health care professionals from France have come to the aid of Mayotte. They have all been tested prior to boarding, and will not be quarantined on arrival, but have to abide by special precautionary rules.
- On 15 April, a group of students from Mayotte in France, have written open letter that they wished to be repatriated because they have been confined in a near empty dormitory for almost a month now. No plans for repatriation from France have been announced yet, however on 2 May the Delegation of Mayotte in Paris (DMP) will provide emergency aid to the student and other residents stranded in mainland France. The French government have announced a €200,- grant to all students under 25 stranded in France. The Union of Reunion Students of France has already expressed their disappointment.
- A positive case was discovered from Comoros where there are officially no COVID-19 infections. As a result, all nautical activities have been banned in order to better guard against illegal border crossings by boat.
- On 16 April, measures have been put in place for pregnant women, because up to date 10 tested positive. 1,600 tests have been performed.
- Jean-François Colombet, the Prefect of Mayotte, said that the current situation is a fight on multiple fronts where food aid is also a major issue. €2 million in food stamps are being distributed. Colombet also calls upon the food markets to remain open during Ramadan.
- On 17 April, the fourth death was announced. 1,700 tests have been performed up to now.
- On 18 April, it was announced that 108 people had died in March, an increase of 30% compared to 2019. 40% of the deaths are people over 75.
- On 20 April, Dominique Voynet announced that she considered postponing the deconfinement until after Ramadan. Mayotte is also facing an epidemic of dengue with more than 1,000 confirmed cases.
- On 21 April, the National Institute of Statistics and Economic Studies published a report on the living conditions of people of Mayotte under confinement. 30.4% of the population is living in 1 or 2 room houses with 4 more or people, and 81,000 people do not have access to water in their house, which makes effective isolation difficult.
- On 23 April, the Association of Mayotte Mayors consider that the conditions for reopening of schools on 11 May as announced by Macron are not met, and want more guarantees.
- On 24 April, Mahamoud Hamada Sanda, the Grand Qadi, has called on the population to pray and celebrate Ramadan individually and not to engage in communal meals. All 325 mosques are closed and will remain closed as long as necessary.
- On 25 April, it was announced that a private laboratory will also be doing testing. As of 25 April, more than 2,500 tests have been performed.
- As of 27 April, Mayotte is the most affected overseas territory, and now has 1,550 cases per million.
- The Armed Forces delivered 15 tons of food to Mayotte. The shipment consists of fresh fruit and vegetables, meat, eggs, sugar and chocolate but also hygienic products.
- On 28 April, there was no update on either the site of the Prefecture and on ARS. On 29 April, there was a statement by Dominique Voynet that there were 40 more cases on the 28th and 39 more cases on the 29th.
- On 29 April, stage 3 had been declared for Mayotte which means that the virus is now actively circulating the island. Deconfinement on 11 May is out of the question.
- On 30 April, Annick Girardin, Minister of Overseas France, has announced a doubling of the tests in Mayotte and the establishment of a field hospital. Most overseas territories either have little or no spread or have the epidemic under control. Mayotte however is a concern. Mayotte has tested over 3,000 people out of population of 262,895 (2017) up to now. The number of confirmed cases stood at 539 of which 300 were still active. Four COVID-19 deaths had been reported.

=== May 2020 ===
- On 1 May, there was no official update of the number of cases, however it was announced that there were four more deaths bringing the total to 8. The number had been revised down to six on 2 May, because two people tested negative.
- On 4 May, it was announced that the imam of the Friday mosque in Mamoudzou, Sheikh Abdourahamane Ben Omar died of COVID-19. Ben Omar died in the night of Sunday to Monday.
- Prime Minister Edouard Philippe said that a decision about deconfinement for Mayotte will be postponed until 13 May.
- On 7 May, it was announced that Mayotte would the only department of France for which the lockdown will not be lifted four days later. Not only is the number of cases per capita (3,248/M) higher than the French average (2,053/M), the number of cases is increasing.
- On 8 May, Jacques Billant, Prefect of Réunion, confirmed that patients from Mayotte were transferred to Réunion. Two medical evacuation had been carried out recently.
- On 11 May, Overseas Minister Annick Girardin announced additional resources including a field hospital and 100 health workers. The current field hospital is already evolving into a city hospital. To alleviate the hospitals, cases were evacuated to Réunion.
- One of the new cases is a newborn baby infected by the mother. The hospital reported that there was no reason for concern.
- On 12 May, it was announced that one of the first patients in intensive care has recovered. His condition worsened, he was hospitalized, moved to intensive care, intubated, placed in an induced coma, but emerged from his coma and was able to breathe again. He is currently recovering in Réunion and regaining strength.
- On 31 May, COVID-19 was discovered in the Majicavo prison. All inmates, guards, and staff have been tested. 107 have thus far tested positive. Another 45 tested positive on 1 June. By the end of May there had been 1871 confirmed cases and 23 fatalities.

=== Subsequent cases ===
- 2020 cases

There were 5,890 reported cases and 55 deaths in 2020. 236 of the cases could be linked to clusters inside the Majicavo prison, 47 to a cluster in a municipality in northern Mayotte and 52 to a cluster at the Foreign Legion Detachment in Mayotte.

A study of the spread from March 2020 to March 2021 across Mayotte shows that up to 2000 cases could be linked to 185 identified infection clusters (99 in companies; 31 in associations; 23 in family settings; 14 in health or social establishments; 9 in schools or universities; 4 in connection with events; 3 in prison; one each in a military regiment and one on board an aircraft).

- 2021 cases

The first case of the 501.V2 variant was confirmed on 15 January. Mayotte's vaccination campaign started on 25 January. By the end of the month, 78 cases of 501.V2 had been identified. The first case of the B.1.1.7 variant was confirmed the last week of January.

Of Mayotte's inhabitants aged 15 years or more, 71% were found to have antibodies to COVID-19 in 2021.

There were 17,797 reported cases and 130 deaths in 2021, bringing the total number of reported cases to 23,687 and the death toll to 185. 71 of the cases could be linked to clusters inside the Majicavo prison.

- 2022 cases

There were 18,306 reported cases and two deaths in 2022, bringing the total number of reported cases to 41,993 and the death toll to 187.

- 2023 cases

There were 34 reported cases and one death in 2023, bringing the total number of reported cases to 42,027 and the death toll to 188.

== Preventive measures ==
- 15 March 2020 - All schools are closed.
- 15 March 2020 - Social distancing must be observed. All non-essential businesses must close.
- 18 March 2020 - People entering Mayotte must self isolate for 14 days.
- 20 March 2020 - Access to beaches, coves and (uninhabited) islands is prohibited.
- 25 March 2020 - A curfew was instituted between 20:00 and 05:00. Gathering with more than two people are banned. Traffic restrictions apply throughout the island.
- 22 April 2020 - Farmers' markets are reopened in Coconi, Chirongui, and Kaweni. On 3 May, a market opened in Sada.

== Statistics ==
Chronology of the number of active cases

Recoveries are no longer listed as of 21 August 2020

Source: Point de situation at mayotte.gouv.fr

== See also ==
- COVID-19 pandemic in Africa
- COVID-19 pandemic by country and territory
- COVID-19 pandemic in the Comoros
- COVID-19 pandemic in Réunion
