= COVID-19 pandemic in Mauritania =

- Disease: COVID-19
- Pathogen: SARS-CoV-2
- Location: Mauritania
- Index case: Nouakchott
- Arrival date: 13 March 2020 (6 years, 5 months, 1 week and 2 days)
- Confirmed cases: 63,891 (updated 5 August 2026)
- Deaths: 997 (updated 5 August 2026)

The COVID-19 pandemic in Mauritania was a part of the worldwide pandemic of coronavirus disease 2019 (COVID-19) caused by severe acute respiratory syndrome coronavirus 2 (SARS-CoV-2). The COVID-19 pandemic was confirmed to have reached Mauritania in March 2020.

== Background ==
On 12 January 2020, the World Health Organization (WHO) confirmed that a novel coronavirus was the cause of a respiratory illness in a cluster of people in Wuhan City, Hubei Province, China, which was reported to the WHO on 31 December 2019.

The case fatality ratio for COVID-19 has been much lower than SARS of 2003, but the transmission has been significantly greater, with a significant total death toll. Model-based simulations for Mauritania indicate that the 95% confidence interval for the time-varying reproduction number R_{t} has been lower than 1.0 since December 2020.

== Timeline ==
=== March 2020 ===
- On 13 March, the first case was confirmed, with the case being placed in isolation.
- The case is an expatriate from a yet to be disclosed country, in the Mauritanian capital of Nouakchott.
- On 18 March, the Mauritanian Minister of Health announced the discovery of a second positive coronavirus case on a foreign female employee, working at a house of a couple of expatriates, the woman arrived 10 days prior the discovery.
- A third coronavirus case was declared on 26 March for a 74-year-old man, a Mauritanian citizen who had arrived in Mauritania on 15 March from France via Air France.
- The country recorded its first death on 30 March 2020. By the end of March there had been six confirmed cases, one death and two recoveries, leaving three active cases.

=== April to June 2020 ===
- On 18 April, the last remaining active case recovered. On that date, there had been 7 confirmed cases in the country, 6 of whom had recovered, and one of whom had died, making Mauritania temporarily one of few affected countries in the world to become free of COVID-19.
- On 29 April, a Senegalese citizen tested positive. The case is a 68-year woman living in the state of Nouakchott.
- There were two new cases in April, bringing the total number of confirmed cases to 8. The death toll remained unchanged. Between 18 and 29 April there were no active cases; at the end of April the woman having tested positive on 29 April was the only active case.
- On 6 May, with only one active case, restrictions were partially eased. By the end of May, the number confirmed active cases had increased to 480 while the death toll had increased to 23. The total number of confirmed cases grew to 530 in May, 27 of whom recovered.
- There were 3707 new cases in June, bringing the total number of confirmed cases to 4237. The death toll rose to 128. There were 2612 active cases at the end of June.

=== Subsequent cases ===
- 2020 cases

There were 14,364 confirmed cases in 2020. 11,678 patients recovered while 349 persons died. At the end of 2020 there were 2,637 active cases.

- 2021 cases

Vaccinations started on 26 March, initially using 50,000 doses of the Sinopharm BIBP vaccine and 5,000 doses of the Pfizer–BioNTech COVID-19 vaccine donated by the United Arab Emirates.

There were 27,109 confirmed cases in 2021, bringing the total number of cases to 41,473. 27,497 patients recovered in 2021 while 517 persons died, bringing the total death toll to 866. At the end of 2021 there were 1,432 active cases.

Modelling by WHO's Regional Office for Africa suggests that due to under-reporting, the true number of infections by the end of 2021 was around 2.1 million while the true number of COVID-19 deaths was around 1083.

- 2022 cases

On 4 January, it was confirmed that President Mohamed Ould Ghazouani had tested positive for COVID-19.

There were 21,952 confirmed cases in 2022, bringing the total number of cases to 63,425. 131 persons died, bringing the total death toll to 997.

- 2023 cases

There were 373 new cases in 2023, bringing the total number of confirmed cases to 63,798. The death toll remained unchanged.

== See also ==
- COVID-19 pandemic in Africa
- COVID-19 pandemic by country and territory
