= COVID-19 pandemic in Sudan =

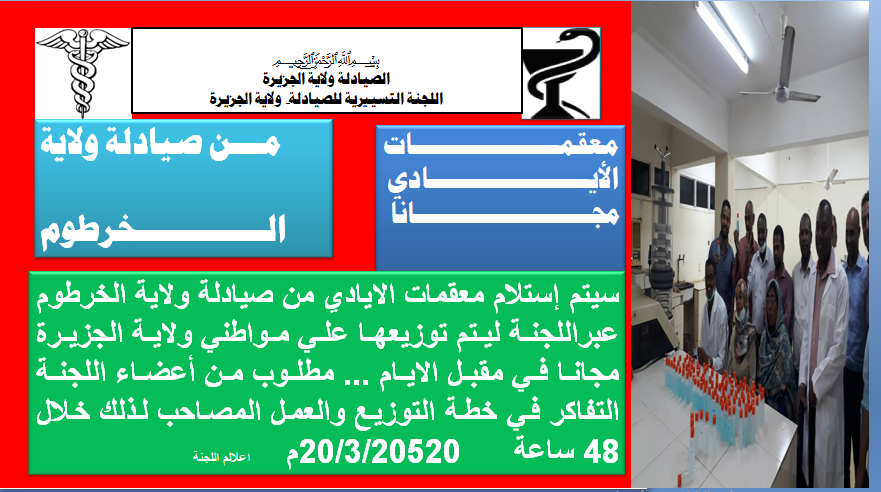
- Disease: COVID-19
- Pathogen: SARS-CoV-2
- Location: Sudan
- First outbreak: Wuhan, Hubei, China
- Index case: Khartoum
- Arrival date: 13 March 2020 (6 years, 7 months, 2 weeks and 1 day)
- Confirmed cases: 63,993 (updated 18 September 2026)
- Recovered: 58,640
- Deaths: 5,046 (updated 18 September 2026)

Government website
- http://sho.gov.sd/corona/index.php

The COVID-19 pandemic in Sudan was a part of the worldwide pandemic of coronavirus disease 2019 (COVID-19) caused by severe acute respiratory syndrome coronavirus 2 (SARS-CoV-2). The virus was confirmed to have reached Sudan in March 2020.

== Background ==
On 12 January 2020, the World Health Organization (WHO) confirmed that a novel coronavirus was the cause of a respiratory illness in a cluster of people in Wuhan, Hubei, China, which was reported to the WHO on 31 December 2019.

The case fatality ratio for COVID-19 has been much lower than SARS of 2003, but the transmission has been significantly greater, with a significant total death toll.

== Timeline 2020 ==
=== March ===
- On 13 March, Sudan reported its first novel coronavirus case in Khartoum, a man who died on 12 March 2020 and had visited the United Arab Emirates in the first week of March.
- On 23 March, South Darfur reported eight new cases of COVID-19, including two Egyptian soldiers of the United Nations–African Union Mission in Darfur (UNAMID).
- Sudan stopped issuing visas for, and flights to, eight countries, including Italy and neighbouring Egypt, over fears of the coronavirus outbreak.
- By the end of March there had been seven confirmed cases. Two patients died, one recovered, and four remained active cases at the end of March.

=== April to June ===
- In April there were 435 new cases, raising the total number of confirmed cases to 442. The death toll rose to 31. The number of recovered patients increased to 39, leaving 372 active patients at the end of the month.
- By 29 May, a surge of reported deaths in North Darfur raised fears of a serious outbreak in the region, although testing remains poor.
- During the month of May there were 4584 new cases, bringing the total number of confirmed cases to 5026. The death toll rose to 286. The number of recovered patients increased to 1423, leaving 3317 active cases.
- There were 4232 new cases in June, bringing the total number of confirmed cases to 9258. The death toll doubled to 572. The number of recovered patients increased to 4015, leaving 4671 active cases at the end of the month.

=== July to September ===
- During July there were 2386 new cases, raising the total number of confirmed cases to 11644. The death toll rose to 746. The number of recovered patients increased by 2104 to 6119, leaving 4779 active cases at the end of the month (up by 2% from the end of June).
- There were 1545 new cases in August, bringing the total number of confirmed cases to 13189. The death toll rose to 823. There were 5754 active cases at the end of the month, representing an increase of 20% from the end of July.
- There were 451 new cases in September, bringing the total number of confirmed cases to 13640. The death toll rose to 836.

=== October to December ===
- There were 164 new cases in October, bringing the total number of confirmed cases to 13804. The death toll rose to 837. Model-based simulations suggest that the 95% confidence interval for the time-varying reproduction number R_{t} was around 2.0 in October.
- There were 4006 new cases in November, bringing the total number of confirmed cases to 17810. The death toll rose to 1249. There were 6259 active cases at the end of the month.
- There were 5506 new cases in December, raising the total number of confirmed cases to 23316. The death toll rose to 1468. There were 8324 active cases at the end of the month.

== Timeline 2021 ==
=== January to March ===
- There were 3957 new cases in January, taking the total number of confirmed cases to 27273. The death toll rose to 1812. There were 3985 active cases at the end of the month.
- There were 1078 new cases in February, taking the total number of confirmed cases to 28351. The death toll rose to 1880. There were 3564 active cases at the end of the month.
- On March 3, 2021, Sudan received 828.000 doses of the AstraZeneca-produced vaccine at Khartoum airport and expects 3.4 million doses through COVAX in the second quarter of 2021. Vaccinations started on 9 March. By September 20% of Sudan's population is expected to be covered.
- There were 1760 news cases in March, taking the total number of confirmed cases to 30111. The death toll rose to 2063. There were 3834 active cases at the end of the month.

=== April to June ===
- There were 2993 news cases in April, taking the total number of confirmed cases to 33104. The death toll rose to 2349. There were 3960 active cases at the end of the month.
- There were 2408 new cases in May, taking the total number of confirmed cases to 35512. The death toll rose to 2631. There were 3574 active cases at the end of the month.
- There were 1146 new cases in June, taking the total number of confirmed cases to 36658. The death toll rose to 2754. There were 3388 active cases at the end of the month.

=== July to September ===
- There were 527 new cases in July, taking the total number of confirmed cases to 37185. The death toll rose to 2776. There were 3495 active cases at the end of the month.
- There were 514 new cases in August, bringing the total number of confirmed cases to 37699. The death toll rose to 2831. There were 3238 active cases at the end of the month.
- There were 564 new cases in September, bringing the total number of confirmed cases to 38263. The death toll rose to 2902. There were 3286 active cases at the end of the month.

=== October to December ===
- There were 1999 new cases in October, bringing the total number of confirmed cases to 40262. The death toll rose to 3104.
- There were 2967 new cases in November, bringing the total number of confirmed cases to 43229. The death toll rose to 3159.
- There were 3289 new cases in December, bringing the total number of confirmed cases to 46518. The death toll rose to 3331.

== Timeline 2022 ==
=== January to March ===
- There were 8630 new cases in January, raising the total number of confirmed cases to 55148. The death toll rose to 3666.
- There were 6228 new cases in February, raising the total number of confirmed cases to 61376. The death toll rose to 3901.
- There were 579 new cases in March, bringing the total number of confirmed cases to 61955. The death toll rose to 4907.

=== April to June ===
- There were 162 new cases in April, bringing the total number of confirmed cases to 62117. The death toll rose to 4931.
- There were 257 new cases in May, bringing the total number of confirmed cases to 62374. The death toll rose to 4942.
- There were 250 new cases in June, bringing the total number of confirmed cases to 62624. The death toll rose to 4951.

=== July to September ===
- There were 382 new cases in July, bringing the total number of confirmed cases to 63006. The death toll rose to 4957.
- There were 222 new cases in August, bringing the total number of confirmed cases to 63228. The death toll rose to 4961.
- There were 52 new cases in September, bringing the total number of confirmed cases to 63280. The death toll remained unchanged.

=== October to December ===
- There were 229 new cases in October, bringing the total number of confirmed cases to 63509. The death toll rose to 4972.
- There were 128 new cases in November, bringing the total number of confirmed cases to 63637. The death toll rose to 4990.
- There were 49 new cases in December, bringing the total number of confirmed cases to 63686. The death toll rose to 4994.

== Timeline 2023 ==
- There were 307 confirmed cases in 2023, bringing the total number of cases in 63,993. 52 persons died, bringing the total death toll to 5,046.

== Statistics ==
=== Confirmed new cases per day ===
View source data.

=== Confirmed deaths per day ===
View source data.

== See also ==
- COVID-19 pandemic in Africa
- COVID-19 pandemic by country and territory
