= COVID-19 vaccination in the Comoros =

Plan to immunize against COVID-19

- Date: April 10, 2021 - present
- Location: Comoros
- Cause: COVID-19 pandemic

COVID-19 vaccination in Comoros is an ongoing immunisation campaign against severe acute respiratory syndrome coronavirus 2 (SARS-CoV-2), the virus that causes coronavirus disease 2019 (COVID-19), in response to the ongoing pandemic in the country.

Comoros began its vaccination program on 10 April 2021, initially using the 100,000 doses of the Sinopharm BIBP vaccine donated by China. As of 8 June 2021, 84,360 doses have been administered, 43,140 people with one dose and 41,220 people fully vaccinated. On 26 June 2021, Comoros purchased 200,000 additional doses of the Sinopharm BIBP vaccine, followed five days later by 100,000 doses donated by China.

== Progress ==
Cumulative vaccinations in Comoros

View source data.
