= COVID-19 pandemic in North America =

- Map last updated: December 2020 <500 confirmed cases 500–1,000 1,000–2,000 2,000–5,000 5,000–10,000 10,000–50,000 50,000–100,000 100,000–200,000 >200,000 confirmed cases
- Disease: COVID-19
- Pathogen: SARS-CoV-2
- Location: North America
- First outbreak: Wuhan, Hubei, China
- Index case: Santa Clara County, California, United States
- Arrival date: 25 February 2020 – 5 May 2023 (6 years and 10 months ago)
- Confirmed cases: 97 million
- Recovered: 88.9 million
- Deaths: 1.4 million
- Territories: 39

The first cases of the COVID-19 pandemic in North America were reported in the United States on 23 January 2020. Saint Kitts and Nevis was the last North American country to report a case of COVID-19, doing so on 25 March. Bonaire confirmed a case on 16 April, becoming the last territory to do so.

On 26 March 2020, the United States became the country in North America with the highest number of confirmed COVID-19 infections, at over 82,000 cases. On 11 April 2020, the United States became the country in North America with the highest official death toll for COVID-19, at over 20,000 deaths. As of 10 April 2022, there are about 97 million cases and about 1.4 million deaths in North America; about 88.9 million have recovered from COVID-19, meaning that nearly 11 out of 12 cases have recovered or that the recovery rate is nearly 92%.

As of 15 December 2023, the United States has had the highest number of cases in North America, at over 103 million cases, as well as the highest death toll, at over a million deaths. There have been nearly 75.7 million recoveries in the United States as of 15 December 2023, meaning that nearly 12 out of 13 cases in the country have recovered or that the recovery rate is about 92%. On 20 March 2022, the number of COVID-19 deaths in the United States exceeded a million.

As of 15 December 2023, Canada has reported over 4.7 million cases and over 53,000 deaths, while Mexico, which was overtaken in terms of the number of cases on 11 March 2022, the second anniversary of the day when the COVID-19 outbreak became a pandemic, by Japan, the second most affected country in East Asia, has reported about 5.7 million cases and about 320,000 deaths. The state in the United States with the highest number of cases and the highest death toll is California, at about 9.1 million cases and nearly 90,000 deaths as of 10 April 2022.

As of November, 2026, North America had recorded approximately 124.5 million confirmed cases of COVID-19, and 1.72 million deaths, making it one of the regions most severely affected by the pandemic.

== Statistics by country and territory ==
Summary table of confirmed cases in North America (as of 15 December 2023)
Country/Territory	Cases	Deaths	Recoveries	Ref
United States	103,436,829	1,144,877	no data	
Mexico	7,702,476	334,930	no data	
Canada	4,738,288	53,348	no data	
Guatemala	1,280,212	20,269	1,259,444	
Puerto Rico	1,252,713	5,938	no data	
Costa Rica	1,230,653	9,368	no data	
Cuba	1,115,043	8,530	1,104,098	
Panama	1,041,804	8,651	no data	
Dominican Republic	661,180	4,384	no data	
Honduras	472,743	11,114	no data	
Martinique	230,354	1,104	no data	
Guadeloupe	203,235	1,021	no data	
El Salvador	201,833	4,230	179,410	
Trinidad and Tobago	191,496	4,390	no data	
Jamaica	156,536	3,631	103,180	
Barbados	110,277	648	no data	
Belize	71,373	688	no data	
Curaçao	45,883	305	no data	
Aruba	44,224	292	no data	
Bahamas	38,003	844	36,811	
Haiti	34,493	860	33,372	
Cayman Islands	31,472	37	no data	
Saint Lucia	30,209	410	29,095	
United States Virgin Islands	25,874	133	25,726	
Grenada	19,693	238	no data	
Bermuda	18,860	165	18,685	
Nicaragua	16,084	245	no data	
Dominica	15,760	74	15,673	
Collectivity of Saint Martin	12,324	46	no data	
Greenland	11,971	21	no data	
Sint Maarten	11,051	92	10,932	
Bonaire	9,864	33	no data	
Saint Vincent and the Grenadines	9,631	124	9,493	
Antigua and Barbuda	9,106	146	no data	
British Virgin Islands	7,392	64	no data	
Saint Kitts and Nevis	6,607	48	6,559	
Turks and Caicos Islands	6,565	38	6,509	
Saint Barthélemy	5,507	5	no data	
Anguilla	3,904	12	3,849	
Saint Pierre and Miquelon	3,426	2	no data	
Montserrat	1,403	8	1,376	
Sint Eustatius	1,221	6	1,159	
Saba	837	2	no data	
Total	49,457,037	1,014,111	38,438,299	

== Timeline by country and territory ==
Counting of cases are subject to the number of tested people.

=== Antigua and Barbuda ===
The COVID-19 pandemic was confirmed to have reached Antigua and Barbuda on 13 March 2020.

As of 10 March 2023, Antigua and Barbuda has reported 9,106 total cases and 146 deaths.

=== The Bahamas ===
The COVID-19 pandemic was confirmed to have reached the Bahamas on 15 March 2020 with the announcement of the first case.

As of 10 March 2023, the Bahamas has reported 37,491 total cases and 833 deaths.

=== Barbados ===
Barbados announced its first two confirmed cases on 17 March 2020 and declared a public health emergency on 26 March.

As of 18 January 2026, Barbados has reported 109,141 total cases and 593 deaths.

=== Belize ===
The COVID-19 pandemic was confirmed to have reached Belize on 23 March 2020.

As of 13 January 2021, Belize reported 11,366 total cases, 587 active cases, and 277 deaths. This comes out to 690 deaths per one million population.

=== British Overseas Territories ===
==== Anguilla ====
The first two cases of the virus were confirmed on 26 March 2020. On 26 April 2020, all patients recovered.

As of 13 January 2021, Anguilla reported 15 total cases, 13 recoveries, and two deaths.

==== Bermuda ====
The COVID-19 pandemic was confirmed to have reached the British Overseas Territory of Bermuda on 18 March 2020.

==== Cayman Islands ====
The COVID-19 pandemic was confirmed to have reached the British Overseas Territory of the Cayman Islands on 12 March 2020.

On 17 December 2020, Mercer University pre-med student Skylar Mack, 18, from United States, and her boyfriend Vanjae Ramgeet, 24, of the Cayman Islands, were sentenced to four months in prison for her violating the island's mandatory two-week quarantine two days after arriving from the United States, and for his aiding and abetting her. The sentence was later reduced to two months.

As of 13 January 2021, the Cayman Islands reported 362 total cases, 35 active cases, and two deaths.

==== Montserrat ====
The territory's first case was confirmed on 17 March 2020. Schools have been closed and public gatherings banned as a precautionary measure. By 15 May 2020, all cases had fully recovered. On 10 July, a 12th case was discovered.

As of 13 January 2021, Montserrat reported 13 total cases, 12 recoveries, and one death.

==== Turks and Caicos Islands ====
The COVID-19 pandemic was confirmed to have reached the British Overseas Territory of the Turks and Caicos Islands on 23 March 2020. On 12 May 2020, the last two cases recovered. There are currently no active cases, because one person left the country. On 20 June 2020, a new case was discovered.

As of 24 March 2023, Turks and Caicos reported 6,752 total cases, 3 active cases, and 40 deaths.

==== British Virgin Islands ====
On 25 March 2020, the first two cases in the country were confirmed.

As of 13 January 2021, the British Virgin Islands reported 114 total cases, 18 active cases, and one death.

=== Canada ===
The virus was confirmed to have reached Canada on January 25, 2020, after an individual who had returned to Toronto from Wuhan, Hubei, China, tested positive. The first case of community transmission in Canada was confirmed in British Columbia on March 5. In March 2020, as cases of community transmission were confirmed, all of Canada's provinces and territories declared states of emergency. Provinces and territories implemented, to varying degrees, school and daycare closures, prohibitions on gatherings, closures of non-essential businesses and restrictions on entry. Canada severely restricted its border access, barring travelers from all countries with some exceptions. The federal Minister of Health invoked the Quarantine Act, introduced following the 2002–2004 SARS outbreak. For the first time in its legislative history, the act was used, legally requiring all travelers (excluding essential workers) returning to the country to self-isolate for 14 days, until rules were changed to accommodate fully vaccinated travelers.

Near the end of summer 2021, cases surged across Canada, particularly in British Columbia, Alberta, Quebec and Ontario, described as a "pandemic of the unvaccinated". A July 2021 PHAC epidemiology report said that those who were unvaccinated represented almost 90% of COVID cases reported. This fourth wave led to the reinstatement of pandemic restrictions like mask mandates in provinces such as British Columbia and Alberta. Consequently, vaccine passports were introduced in all provinces and two territories. Federally, Prime Minister Justin Trudeau implemented vaccination requirements for air travel, Via Rail and Rocky Mountaineer trains, and federally regulated workers, effective October 30, 2021.

=== Colombia ===
On 6 March 2020, the first case in Colombia was confirmed.

As of January 2023, over 6,000,000 cases were reported, with over 140,000 confirmed deaths.

=== Costa Rica ===
On 6 March 2020, the first case in Costa Rica was confirmed, which was also the first such case in Central America.

As of 13 January 2021, Costa Rica reported 182,156 total cases, 39,805 active cases, and 2,384 deaths. This comes out to 466 deaths per one million population.

=== Cuba ===
On 11 March 2020, the first cases in Cuba were confirmed. As of 12 May 2020, new cases had fallen to less than 20 per day, and a program of mass testing was beginning.

Infections went up fourfold in January and February 2021. Cuba's death toll of 324 is well under the world average per capita, but health authorities worry that it is increasing. The government says two of its four vaccines should begin final trials in late March.

=== Greenland (Kingdom of Denmark) ===
The COVID-19 pandemic was confirmed to have spread to Greenland – an autonomous territory of the Kingdom of Denmark – in March 2020.

=== Dominica ===
On 22 March 2020, the first case of COVID-19 was confirmed on the island of Dominica. It was a woman who recently came back from the UK.

As of 13 January 2021, Dominica reported 109 total cases, eight active cases, but no deaths.

=== Dominican Republic ===
On 1 March 2020, the first case in the Dominican Republic was confirmed, which was also the first case in the Caribbean.

As of 13 January 2021, the Dominican Republic reported 186,383 total cases, 43,738 active cases, and 2,428 deaths. This comes out to 223 deaths per one million population.

=== Dutch Caribbean ===
==== Aruba ====
On 13 March 2020, Prime Minister Evelyn Wever-Croes announced the first two confirmed cases of coronavirus on the island.

As a result, the country restricted entry of all individuals coming from Europe via air and seaports – starting on 15 March and in effect until 31 March – with the exception of those who are Aruban citizens. They also suspended public and private school classes for the week of 16 March, as well as all large-scale public gatherings. On 29 May, all cases recovered. On 29 June, two more cases had been discovered.

As of 13 April 2024, Aruba reported 44,224 total cases, 624 active cases, and 52 deaths. This comes out to 486 deaths per one million population.

==== Curaçao ====
Coronavirus was documented for the first time in Curaçao on 13 March 2020. The case was a 68-year-old man who was on vacation from the Netherlands. By 9 July, all cases recovered. On 15 July, a new case was discovered. On 6 August, all cases resolved.

As of 13 January 2021, Curaçao reported 4,488 total cases, 1494 active cases, and 292 deaths. This comes out to 116 deaths per one million population.

==== Sint Maarten ====
As of 18 March 2020there has been one confirmed case in Sint Maarten. Schools have been shut for a period of two weeks. By 15 June, all cases recovered. On 1 July 2020, a new case was discovered, which resolved 3 July. On 15 July, a 79th case was discovered.

As of 13 January 2021, Sint Martin reported 1,589 total cases, 102 active cases, and 27 deaths.

==== Caribbean Netherlands ====
As of 13 January 2021, the Caribbean Netherlands reported 249 total cases, 65 active cases, and three deaths.

===== Bonaire =====
On 16 April 2020, Edison Rijna, Island Governor of Bonaire announced the first case of COVID-19 on the island. The island was already closed to international travel. On 28 April 2020, all cases had recovered. On 14 July, two new cases had been discovered.

===== Saba =====
On 12 April 2020, the first case was confirmed in Saba. Schools, bars and 'non-essential services' are all currently shut. On 12 May, all cases on Saba recovered. On 1 August, two new cases were discovered.

===== Sint Eustatius =====
On 31 March 2020, the first two cases were confirmed, they were two young men from the Netherlands who arrived on 15 March and self isolated after arrival. On 5 May all cases had recovered.

=== El Salvador ===
The COVID-19 pandemic was confirmed to have reached El Salvador on 18 March 2020.

As of 13 January 2021, El Salvador reported 49,539 total cases, 4,282 active cases, and 1,447 deaths. This comes out to 222 deaths per one million population.

=== Overseas France ===
Two cases of the coronavirus were confirmed on 1 March 2020 in the French collectivity of Saint Martin, having travelled from France through Dutch Sint Maarten and French collectivity of Saint Barthélemy, where they infected their son who is a resident. They then returned to Sint Maarten and were detected at the airport and transferred to French Saint Martin hospital for isolation. According to the French Ministry of Health situation reports, as of 6 March, there have been two confirmed cases in Martinique, two in Saint Martin and one in Saint Barthélemy. On 5 April 2020, St. Pierre and Miquelon recorded its first verified case.

==== Region of Guadeloupe ====
The COVID-19 pandemic was confirmed to have spread to the French overseas department and region of Guadeloupe on 12 March 2020.

As of 13 January 2021, Guadeloupe reported 8,776 total cases, 6,380 active cases, and 154 deaths. This comes out to 385 deaths per one million population.

==== Region of Martinique ====
The COVID-19 pandemic was confirmed to have reached the French overseas department and region of Martinique on 5 March 2020.

As of 13 January 2021, Martinique reported 6,184 total cases, 6,043 active cases, and 43 deaths. This comes out to 115 deaths per one million population.

==== Collectivity of Saint Barthélemy ====
The COVID-19 pandemic was confirmed to have reached the French overseas collectivity of Saint Barthélemy on 1 March 2020. The last positive case was on 31 March. On 21 April, the last case recovered. Between 18 and 24 July, a new case was imported.

As of 13 January 2021, Saint Barthélemy reported 206 total cases, 33 active cases, and one death.

==== Collectivity of Saint Martin ====
The COVID-19 pandemic was confirmed to have reached the French overseas collectivity of Saint Martin on 1 March 2020.

As of 13 January 2021, Saint Martin reported 1,025 total cases, 158 active cases, and 12 deaths.

==== Saint Pierre and Miquelon ====
The COVID-19 pandemic was confirmed to have reached the French overseas collectivity of Saint Pierre and Miquelon on 5 April 2020.

As of 13 January 2021, Saint Pierre and Miquelon reported 16 total cases, all of whom had recovered.

=== Grenada ===
On 22 March 2020, the first case in the country was confirmed.

As of 13 January 2021, the British Virgin Islands reported 132 total cases, eight active cases, and one death.

=== Guatemala ===
The first case of coronavirus was confirmed to have reached Guatemala on 13 March 2020.

As of 13 January 2021, Guatemala reported 145,986 total cases, 8,362 active cases, and 5,117 deaths. This comes out to 283 deaths per one million population.

=== Haiti ===
On 19 March 2020, the first two cases in the country were confirmed.

As of 13 January 2021, Haiti reported 10,569 total cases, 1,443 active cases, and 238 deaths. This comes out to 21 deaths per one million population.

=== Honduras ===
On 10 March 2020, the first two cases in Honduras were confirmed.

President Juan Orlando Hernandez and his wife tested positive for COVID-19 in June 2020.

As of 13 January 2021, Honduras reported 129,805 total cases, 67,122 active cases, and 3,294 deaths. This comes out to 330 deaths per one million population.

78-year-old Cardinal Óscar Rodríguez Maradiaga was diagnosed with COVID-19 on 4 February 2021.

28-year-old nursing student Keyla Patricia Martínez was arrested in La Esperanza, Intibucá Department and was murdered by choking while in police custody. Her death was originally called a suicide, but following protests it was reclassified as homicide.

=== Jamaica ===
The government announced a travel ban between China and Jamaica. All people entering Jamaica from China will be subject to immediate quarantine for at least 14 days, and anyone who was allowed to land and shows symptoms of the virus will be put in immediate isolation. In keeping with the new policy, 19 Chinese nationals who arrived at the Norman Manley International Airport on the evening of 31 January 2020 were denied entry, quarantined and put on a flight back to China on 1 February.

On 10 March 2020, the Ministry of Health and Wellness (MoHW) confirmed the first case in Jamaica, a female patient who arrived from the United Kingdom on 4 March. The health minister reported that she has been in isolation since 9 March after showing respiratory symptoms. Following the update, the travel ban imposed was expanded to include France, Germany, and Spain.

On 11 March 2020, the country's health minister confirmed the second "imported corona virus [sic]" case.

As of 13 January 2021, Jamaica reported 13,852 total cases, 1,967 active cases, and 317 deaths. This comes out to 107 deaths per one million population.

Confirmed cases doubled in the first two months of 2021, and the death toll stood at 422 on 1 March. All beds dedicated to COVID-19 isolation were full as of 26 February. Jamaica received a vaccine donation from India of 50,000 vaccine doses on 4 March, 124,800 doses via COVAX later in March, and 1.8 million from the African Medical Supply Platform in April.

=== Mexico ===
On 28 February 2020, Mexico confirmed its first three cases. The country's first coronavirus-related death was reported on 18 March 2020. Almost every state reported at least one case of infection. Mexico entered Phase 2 of 3, indicating community transmission, on 24 March. Mexico had 292 imported cases of infection, 70 cases linked to importation, and five cases that were unlinked to foreign contact.

Mexico began vaccinating health workers in Mexico City and Coahuila on 24 December. Vaccinations were expanded to 879 hospitals in all 32 federal entities on 13 January 2021. As of this date Mexico reported 1,556,028 confirmed cases (13th highest in the world), 251,992 active cases, and 135,682 deaths. This is 1,046 deaths per one million inhabitants.

=== Nicaragua ===
Coronavirus was confirmed to have spread to Nicaragua when the first case, a Nicaraguan citizen who had returned to the country from Panama, was confirmed on 18 March 2020.

As of 13 January 2021, Nicaragua reported 6,152 total cases, 1,760 active cases, and 167 deaths. This comes out to 25 deaths per one million population.

=== Panama ===
The Panamanian government has enhanced its sanitary control and screening measures at all ports of entry, to prevent the spread of the virus, isolating and testing potential cases.

On 9 March 2020, the health ministry (MINSA) announced Panama's first coronavirus case, a Panamanian woman in her 40s who had returned from Spain.

On the following day, the MINSA announced seven more COVID-19 cases and one coronavirus-related death.

As of 13 January 2021, Panama reported 288,408 total cases, 56,673 active cases, and 4,594 deaths. This comes out to 1,056 deaths per one million population.

=== Puerto Rico (United States) ===
As of 19 March 2020 the territory has had five confirmed cases. On 17 March governor Wanda Vázquez Garced announced a 24/7 lockdown, with people only allowed to leave their homes for food, gas or medicines.

=== Saint Kitts and Nevis ===
On 25 March 2020, the first two cases in the country were confirmed. By 19 May, all cases recovered.

As of 13 January 2021, Saint Pierre and Miquelon reported 34 total cases, three active cases, but no deaths.

=== Saint Lucia ===
The first case of coronavirus was confirmed to have reached Saint Lucia on 13 March 2020. On 22 April 2020, it was announced that all confirmed cases had recovered. On 28 April 2020, two new cases were discovered.

As of 11 October 2021, Saint Lucia reported 12,017 total cases, 837 active cases, and 224 deaths. Infections increased ten times between January and March.

=== Saint Vincent and the Grenadines ===
On 11 March 2020, Saint Vincent and the Grenadines confirmed its first case.

St. Vincent and Grenadines registered its first COVID-19 death in 2021 and by 1 March had eight deaths.

=== Trinidad and Tobago ===
On 12 March 2020, Trinidad and Tobago confirmed its first case of COVID-19. It was a 52-year-old man who had recently been to Switzerland. He was self-isolated before he began experiencing symptoms of COVID-19.

As of 13 January 2021, Trinidad and Tobago reported 7,305 total cases, 285 active cases, and 129 deaths. This comes out to 92 deaths per one million population.

=== United States ===

COVID-19 cases per 100,000 people by state, as of July 11, 2022

On 17 January 2020, the CDC announced that it would begin screening passengers arriving from Wuhan, China, for symptoms of the new virus, at the John F. Kennedy International Airport, the San Francisco International Airport and the Los Angeles International Airport, beginning Saturday, 18 January

On 20 January 2020, the United States confirmed its first case, of a 35-year-old man who had returned on 15 January to the state of Washington after visiting family in Wuhan, China. The man sought clinical assistance on 19 January.

On 27 February 2020, the CDC reported a case in California which may be the first instance of community transmission in the US.

On 29 February 2020, officials of Washington State confirmed the first reported death from COVID-19 in the US.

By 11 March 2020, the U.S. had tested fewer than 10,000 people. By the end of the month, over 1,000,000 people had been tested. However, health experts stated that this level of testing was still inadequate.

On 26 March 2020, the United States surpassed China and Italy as the country with the most confirmed COVID-19 cases, with a figure above 82,000. The U.S. federal government's health inspectors surveyed 323 hospitals in late March; reporting "severe shortages" of test supplies, "widespread shortages" of personal protective equipment (PPE), and other strained resources due to extended patient stays while awaiting test results.

On 11 April 2020, the United States surpassed Italy as the country with the most confirmed COVID-19 deaths, with a total of over 20,000. The U.S. also became the first to record 2,000 deaths in a single day. Wyoming became the 50th state to be issued a disaster declaration.

By 20 April 2020, the federal government stated it was conducting 150,000 tests per day, and claimed that this number would be enough to allow for schools and businesses to reopen. Health experts estimate that 500,000 to 1,000,000 tests per day would be needed to properly track the spread of the COVID-19, to avoid a new wave of infections.

On 1 October 2020 it was announced first that Hope Hicks had tested positive, and a few hours later it was announced that both President Donald Trump and First Lady Melania had tested positive for COVID-19, who were all part of the broader White House COVID-19 outbreak. Both Trumps recovered from the disease.

On 9 November 2020, the U.S. surpassed 10 million COVID-19 cases, according to data from Johns Hopkins.

On 11 December 2020, the United States Food and Drug Administration (FDA) authorized for the emergency use of the Pfizer-BioNTech COVID-19 vaccine. Following the issuing, it was estimated that 20,000,000 could be vaccinated over the course of a few weeks.

As of 17 February 2021, the U.S. has recorded more than 27 million cases of COVID-19; 483,000 have died.

== See also ==
- History of smallpox in Mexico
- Cocoliztli epidemics Mexico, 1545–1548 and 1576–1580
- 1633 Massachusetts smallpox epidemic
- 1775–1782 North American smallpox epidemic
- 1793 Philadelphia yellow fever epidemic
- 1837 Great Plains smallpox epidemic
- 1847 North American typhus epidemic
- 1889-90 flu pandemic
- 1918 Spanish flu pandemic
- 1924 Los Angeles pneumonic plague outbreak
- 1968 flu pandemic
- 1972 London flu
- Mumps outbreaks in the 21st century
- 2009 flu pandemic
- 2010s Haiti cholera outbreak
- 2013–2014 chikungunya outbreak
- 2015–2016 Zika virus epidemic
- 2017-18 United States flu season
- 2019–2020 dengue fever epidemic
- 2019–2020 United States flu season
- COVID-19 pandemic on cruise ships
- 2020 in the Caribbean
- 2020 in Central America
- 2020s
