= COVID-19 pandemic in Saba =

Ongoing COVID-19 viral pandemic in Saba

- Disease: COVID-19
- Pathogen: SARS-CoV-2
- Location: Saba
- Index case: The Bottom
- Arrival date: 12 April 2020 (6 years, 1 month and 6 days)
- Confirmed cases: 741
- Recovered: 739
- Deaths: 0

Government website
- COVID-19 monthly epidemiological update for the Caribbean part of the Kingdom, National Institute for Public Health and the Environment of the Netherlands - RIVM

The COVID-19 pandemic in Saba was part of the ongoing global viral pandemic of coronavirus disease 2019 (COVID-19), which was confirmed to have reached the Dutch Caribbean island of Saba on April 12, 2020. At the beginning of the pandemic, the island had a population of just over 1,900 people. As of 12 May, all cases were reported to have recovered. On 1 August, two new cases were imported which resolved on 9 September.

== Background ==
On 12 January 2020, the World Health Organization (WHO) confirmed that a novel coronavirus was the cause of a respiratory illness in a cluster of people in Wuhan City, Hubei Province, China, which was reported to the WHO on 31 December 2019.

The case fatality ratio for COVID-19 was much lower than SARS of 2003, but the transmission was significantly greater, with a significant total death toll.

Saba was in a difficult position given its tiny population. Saba's medical facilities could only care for eight people and operations had to be performed on the island of Sint Maarten. For emergencies there was a trauma helicopter available from Sint-Eustatius, however normally it involved a one and a half hour boat journey.

Testing for COVID-19 was originally performed in Sint Maarten, with tests for people without symptoms forwarded to Guadelope. Both rt-PCR based and rapid antigen tests became available on Saba in 2021 through a centralized testing facility which ran from May 2021 until its closure in July 2022.

== Timeline ==
Cases

Deaths

=== March 2020 ===
On 19 March, Saba took precautionary measures by closing the harbor, airport, and schools. Governor Johnson took the measures because of the vulnerable position of the island and the limited medical care. The Saba University School of Medicine ceased classroom activities and switched to online lectures. Some students returned home, but others remained on the island.

=== April 2020 ===
On 7 April, three people self-quarantined and 18 tests had been performed which were all negative.

On 12 April, the first case was confirmed. The patient had mild symptoms. The origin is unknown, because the patient had not traveled and therefore must have been infected locally. One of the people the patient had been in contact had pneumonia. Governor Jonathan Johnson has ordered a lockdown.

As of 13 April, two cases had tested positive. 22 people had been tested, of which 18 were negative with two still pending. 70 people were under quarantine.

On 17 April, it was announced that a curfew would be in effect between 19:00 and 06:00. 44 people had been tested to this point and 17 tests were still pending.

On 22 April, a semi-permanent field hospital arrived in Sint Eustatius, to be used for COVID-19 patients in Bonaire, Sint Eustatius and Saba. The field hospital consists of six ICU beds and was expected be operational on 15 May.

As of 23 April, 73 people had been tested; 41 tests remained pending. 63 people had been quarantined.

On 25 April, it was announced that in order to alleviate the economic hardship, the fixed tariff for electricity and water would be set to zero, and that the price of internet would be set at $25 from 1 May through the end of the year. The island will also receive €150,000 of food aid.

=== May 2020 ===
On 6 May, there was to be a repatriation flight to the Netherlands in Sint Maarten. Saba could not guarantee flights this month, and urged all stranded from the Netherlands or Europe to use this flight.
The first recovery was announced.

On 8 May, Governor Jonathan Johnson announced that from 9 May midnight onward, the stay at home measure would be lifted. Social distancing and prohibition of gatherings would remain. Churches and restaurant may reopen while adhering to hygiene measures. All services and business would be allowed to reopen beginning Monday 11 May. The schools will reopen on 18 May.

On 12 May, all cases recovered. Unrelatedly, Governor Jonathan Johnson was reappointed for his third term. To give recognition to the nurses and everybody involved, the church bells rang on noon.

On 22 May, Governor Jonathan Johnson reported that the person who had been in contact with the first diagnosed case from 12 April, and who had pneumonia, did in fact have COVID-19. She tested negative on the tests, but the results of her blood test showed that she had been infected. The number of cases was therefore increased to three.

=== August 2020 ===
On 1 August, two new cases were imported. The persons went into quarantine upon arrival.

=== September 2020 ===
As of 9 September, all patients had recovered, and Saba no longer has active cases.

=== January 2021 ===
In January 2021, the Dutch government announced plans to provide mRNA vaccinations for all adults over the age of 18, with quantity of vaccine doses shipped to be based on numbers of Saba residents who registered their interest in vaccination. Enough people registered that sufficient doses were shipped to cover the entire adult population.

=== February 2021 ===
At the end of February 2021, vaccination with the Moderna mRNA vaccine against SARS-CoV2 was started. By the end of February 2021, over 85% of the adult population and 70% of the total population had received their first vaccination against SARS-CoV2.

=== March 2021 ===
By the end of March 2021, over 85% of the adult population was fully vaccinated against SARS-CoV2, having received both shots in the Moderna series.

== See also ==
- COVID-19 pandemic in Sint Eustatius
- COVID-19 pandemic in North America
- COVID-19 pandemic by country and territory
