= COVID-19 pandemic in Bonaire =

Ongoing COVID-19 viral pandemic in Bonaire

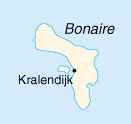
- Disease: COVID-19
- Pathogen: SARS-CoV-2
- Location: Bonaire
- Arrival date: 16 April 2020 (6 years, 7 months and 4 days)
- Confirmed cases: 5 (as of August 2020)
- Active cases: 0
- Recovered: 5
- Deaths: 0

Government website
- bonairegov.com

The COVID-19 pandemic in Bonaire was part of the ongoing global viral pandemic of coronavirus disease 2019 (COVID-19), which was confirmed to have reached the Dutch Caribbean island of Bonaire on 16 April 2020. On 28 April, all cases were reported as having recovered. On 14 July, two new cases were discovered. On 13 August, all cases were again reported as having recovered.

== Background ==
On 12 January 2020, the World Health Organization (WHO) confirmed that a novel coronavirus was the cause of a respiratory illness in a cluster of people in Wuhan, in the Hubei province of China, which was reported to the WHO on 31 December 2019.

The case fatality ratio for COVID-19 has been much lower than SARS of 2003, but the transmission has been significantly greater, with a significant total death toll.

Bonaire is only a small island, with a population at the time of 21,000, and test kits for COVID-19 were in limited supply. Both PCR and antigen tests were available.

== Timeline ==
Cases

Deaths

=== March 2020 ===
On 14 March, Bonaire closed to international travel, including cruise ships. Outbound and local travel between the ABC Islands was allowed. Curaçao cancelled all travel except for local residents, freight and medical specialists from 16 March.

On 25 March, eight medical specialists from the Academic Medical Center in Amsterdam were sent to the hospital on Bonaire and two air ambulances were sent.

=== April 2020 ===
On 5 April, the schools in Bonaire were closed. There were still some students doing their exams who still had to perform a verbal examination. Those examinations continued, in groups of 10 students.

As of 7 April, 26 tests had been performed which were all negative. The Ministry of the Interior and Kingdom Relations of the Netherlands stated that the six islands (Aruba, Bonaire, Curaçao, Saba, Sint-Eustatius and Sint Maarten) would closely cooperate to ensure essential health care and that the Dutch government was negotiating with the government of South American mainland neighbour Colombia to provide specialized care.

On 10 April, respirators, medicine and protective equipment were flown to Aruba, Bonaire and Curaçao by the Dutch government. The shipment contained six ICU beds for Bonaire. The ICU capacity at Hospital San Francisco was then 15 beds.

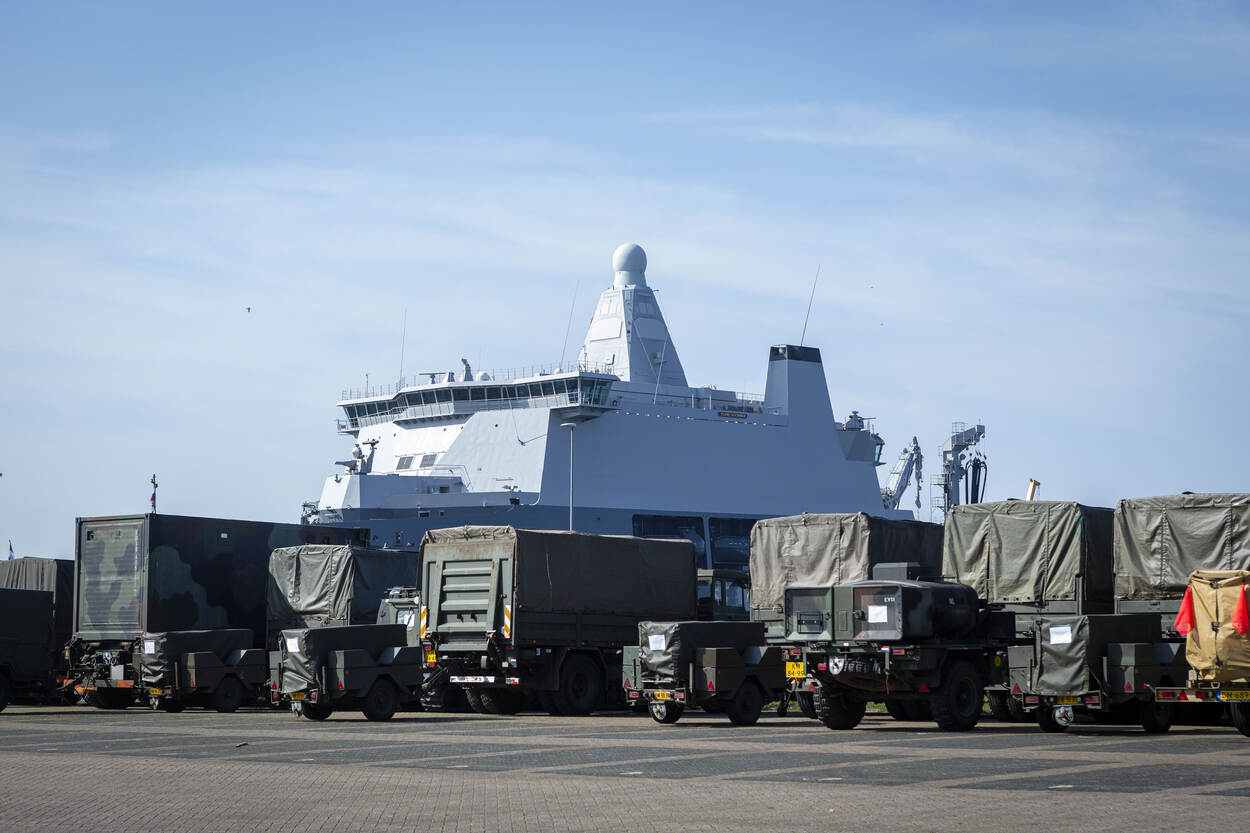
Karel Doorman (2020-04-09)

On 13 April, the Royal Netherlands Navy support ship HNLMS Karel Doorman was dispatched from Den Helder to assist with food aid, border control and public order. A coordination point in Martinique was set up to coordinate the border controls of the Dutch Caribbean and the Caribbean territories of France and of the United Kingdom.

On 14 April, the first group of the 250 inhabitants of Bonaire who were stranded abroad were to be repatriated.

On 16 April, Edison Rijna, Island Governor of Bonaire announced the first case of COVID-19 on the island. The patient, who had mild symptoms, had been tested several times and the results were inconclusive. The patient had visited Aruba several weeks before.

On 17 April, the first two aircraft with repatriates arrived in Bonaire. Quite a number of people, including Rijna, watched the arrival, because it was the first time a Boeing 777 landed at Flamingo International Airport. The repatriates were quarantined for 14 days.

On 20 April, a second case was announced. The patient had been in contact with the first patient, who had already recovered.

On 21 April, the College Financieel Toezicht Bonaire (supervisory financial authority) blocked the attempt of the Public Body of Bonaire to insert $6.3 million into the budget.

On 22 April, a semi-permanent field hospital arrived in Sint Eustatius, to be used for COVID-19 patients in Bonaire, Sint Eustatius and Saba. The field hospital consisted of six ICU beds and was expected be operational on 15 May.

On 25 April, members of the press were invited to be present at meetings of the Island Policy Team (EBT) that had been set up to manage the crisis. The ETB consisted of the Island Governor and delegations from the blue team (police), white team (health care), red team (fire department) and orange team (civil service).

On 28 April, the second active case was reported as the patient having recovered. There were no active cases.

Governor Edison Rijna announced that current measures including school closures would be mitigated in a gradual fashion, but the borders would remain closed. Rijna stressed that people should adhere to social distancing rules and not gather in big groups. As of 27 April, 230 people had been tested, with two people testing positive. On 4 May it was announced that there would be a "deconfinement" from 6 May onwards.

=== May 2020 ===
In order to alleviate economic hardship, the fixed tariffs for electricity and water were set to zero, and the price of internet access was set to $25.- from 1 May until the end of the year. The island was also scheduled to receive €200,000 in food aid.

On 1 May, 24 residents were repatriated from Curaçao and Colombia. They were quarantined on arrival. Governor Rijna was working on repatriation of residents stranded in the United States and in the Netherlands.

On 8 May, it was announced that residents stranded on Curaçao, Saba and St. Eustatius could return home, however they needed the Governor's permission and needed to quarantine for 14 days.

The US Consulate arranged for a repatriation flight on 10 May for American citizens stranded on Aruba, Bonaire, and Curaçao. The aircraft was scheduled to leave from Queen Beatrix International Airport in Aruba and proceed to Hollywood International Airport in Fort Lauderdale, Florida.

=== July 2020 ===
On 14 July, two repatriates to Bonaire tested positive for COVID-19. Both persons were in quarantine. Both had come from Peru.

On 16 July, a relative of the aforementioned two cases tested positive for COVID-19.

On 30 July, the airport began allowing some aircraft from other Caribbean islands with a high prevalence of COVID-19 to land if weather impacted them landing elsewhere. Only aircraft without passengers would be allowed to land, and crew members would have to go into mandatory quarantine at their own expense. Five aircraft from Puerto Rico were expected in the coming days due to Hurricane Isaias.

=== August 2020 ===
On 13 August, all cases were reported as the patients having recovered.

=== January 2021 ===
The travel ban to North America was allowed to expire on 15 January, with flights beginning in early to mid February. All travelers were required to enter with a negative PCR test and a completed health screening.

== Preventive measures ==
- Coming from the airport or port, passengers were required to observe a 14-day quarantine after entering the island.
- Schools were closed until 11 May 2020.
- Social distancing was enforced.
- No lockdown was instituted.
- From 6 May 2020 onwards, gatherings with more than 50 people were still prohibited. Swimming, religious services and visits to entertainment venues such as restaurants, bars and the casino were allowed again providing people obeyed social distancing guidelines, including that there be more than 50 people on the premises. Sex clubs, nightclubs, spas, and saunas remained closed.

On 4 March 2022, all remaining restrictions on the island were rescinded. On 20 April 2022, all requirements and restrictions for arriving travellers were removed.

== See also ==
- COVID-19 pandemic in Aruba
- COVID-19 pandemic in Curaçao
