= COVID-19 vaccination in Romania =

Vaccination campaign against the COVID-19 pandemic in Romania

- Date: 27 December 2020–present
- Location: Nationwide
- Cause: COVID-19 pandemic in Romania
- Organised by: Government of Romania
- Participants: Primary course (Note: As stated on the ECDC COVID-19 Vaccine Tracker website, "primary course is defined according to the schedule included in the Summary of Product Characteristics for each vaccine product as authorised by EMA".): 8,140,137 42.4% First booster: 1,766,621 9.2% Second booster: 27,519 0.1%
- Website: vaccinare-covid.gov.ro

COVID-19 vaccination in Romania started on 27 December 2020. It was announced that the process would be divided into three phases. Medical personnel would be vaccinated first (first phase), followed by the population at risk (second phase), and finally by the rest of the population (third phase). Vaccination was declared free and non-mandatory. As of March 2022, five types of vaccines (Pfizer/BioNTech, Moderna, Oxford/AstraZeneca, Janssen and Novavax) were authorized to be used in Romania. This is the largest vaccination campaign in the modern history of Romania.

Former PNL Prime Minister and self-appointed coordinator of the vaccination campaign Florin Cîțu aimed to have 10.4 million people (or 70% of the country's population) vaccinated by the end of September 2021. However, by the end of September 2021, Romania had the second lowest vaccination rate in the European Union, 33%, just before Bulgaria, and sold part of its expiring vaccine stock to Denmark, Ireland, and South Korea. The low vaccination rate had exposed entrenched distrust in state institutions, misinformation campaigns, poor rural infrastructure, and weak vaccine education.

== Background ==
=== Responsibility for COVID-19 vaccine deployment ===
The National Coordinating Committee for COVID-19 Vaccination Activities (Romanian: Comitetul Național de Coordonare a Activităților privind Vaccinarea împotriva COVID-19; abbreviated CNCAV) is the inter-ministerial body responsible for developing the national vaccination strategy. It was established on 20 November 2020 by Prime Minister's decree and is under the direct subordination of the General Secretariat of the Government and the coordination of the Prime Minister. The first president of the committee is Valeriu Gheorghiță, doctor at the Central Military Hospital in Bucharest.

Romania heavily relied on its military and intelligence services to set up quickly the infrastructure needed to roll out the shots throughout the country. The Romanian Army and structures from the Ministry of Interior are involved in the distribution and transport of vaccines. The online platform used for vaccine registration is also administered by an agency with military status, the Special Telecommunication Service.

=== Vaccines on order ===
Romania has ordered 120 million doses of vaccine or 7.5 doses for each person who can be vaccinated. As of 10 February 2022, it received 31.8 million doses, of which it used only about 16 million. Amid disinterest in vaccination, Romania sold or donated almost 5 million doses to countries such as Argentina, Denmark, Egypt, Ireland, Moldova, Serbia, South Korea, and Ukraine.

Vaccine	Origin	Doses ordered	Doses delivered	Doses used	Approval	Deployment
Pfizer/BioNTech	US/Germany	20 million	19,842,059 (Note: This includes some 330,000 doses of "Comirnaty pediatric", the vaccine with a lower dose of mRNA (10 μg instead of 30 μg) to be administered only to children aged 5–11.)	12,776,224	21 December 2020	26 December 2020
Moderna	US	3.4 million	4,247,900	1,007,017	6 January 2021	12 January 2021
Oxford/AstraZeneca	UK/Sweden	—N/a	4,478,000	852,356	29 January 2021	7 February 2021
Janssen	Netherlands/Israel	8 million	3,785,100	1,826,313	11 March 2021	4 May 2021
Novavax	US				20 December 2021	Pending
CureVac	Germany				Pending	Pending
Valneva	France				Pending	Pending
Sanofi/GSK	France/UK				Pending	Pending
Total		120 million				

== Rollout schedule ==
On 26 December 2020, Ion Cantacuzino Institute in Bucharest received the first symbolic 10,000-dose batch of the Pfizer/BioNTech vaccine. The truck with the first doses of vaccine entered Romania at Nădlac customs the day before in the presence of Raed Arafat, head of the Department for Emergency Situations and Valeriu Gheorghiță, head of the National Coordinating Committee for COVID-19 Vaccination Activities. Vaccination began on 27 December in 10 infectious disease hospitals across the country, with Mihaela Anghel, a nurse at the Matei Balș National Institute for Infectious Diseases in Bucharest, being the first person vaccinated. Anghel was among the personnel that treated the country's first infected person on 27 February of the same year.

On 29 December 2020, Romanian President Klaus Iohannis announced that Romania would help Moldova with a donation of 200,000 doses of COVID-19 vaccine units in the future during his meeting with the Moldovan President Maia Sandu in the country as part of a collaboration project about the COVID-19 pandemic and other topics between the two countries. Iohannis himself was vaccinated on 15 January 2021. The first batch of COVID-19 vaccines destined to be sent to Moldova from Romania, composed of an amount of 20,000 of them, was approved by the Government of Romania on 24 February 2021. Moldova received 21,600 Oxford/AstraZeneca vaccine doses on 27 February from Romania, which started being administered on 2 March. Moldova donated 1,810 of these units to the authorities of the unrecognized state of Transnistria on 5 March, which thanked the Romanian state for the help. Other donations from Romania to Moldova took place on 27 March (50,400 doses) and 7 May (100,800 doses).

The first 14,000-dose batch of the Moderna vaccine arrived in the country on 12 January 2021. The vaccine began to be administered on 4 February.

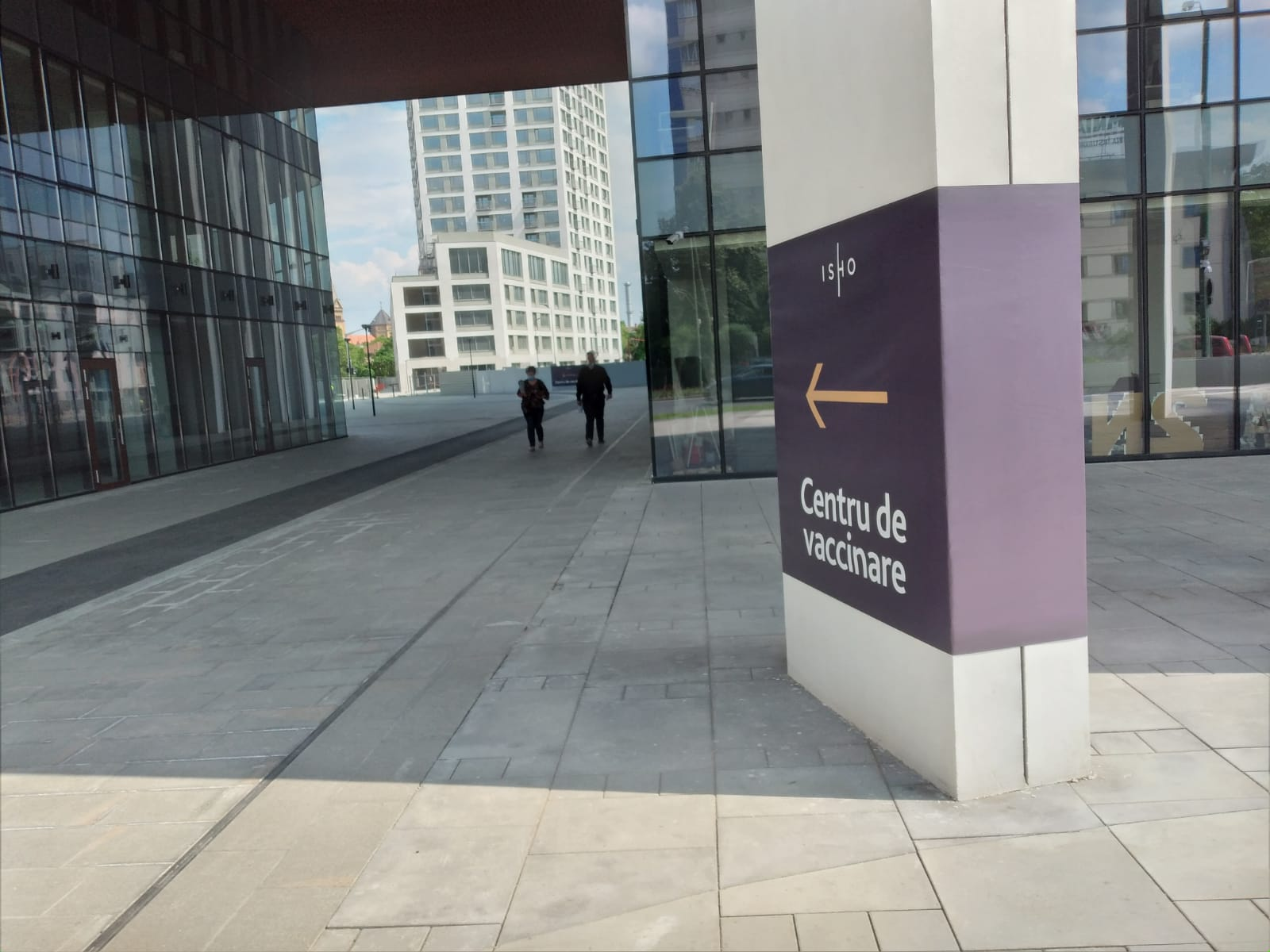
An Oxford/AstraZeneca and Johnson & Johnson vaccination center at ISHO Timișoara

The Oxford/AstraZeneca vaccine arrived in the country on 7 February, the first 81,000 doses being distributed to regional storage centers during the same day. Until 8 March, the vaccination with Oxford/AstraZeneca was intended only for people aged between 18 and 55 years, on the grounds that in the third phase of Oxford/AstraZeneca's clinical trials too few volunteers over 55 were enrolled; on 8 March, CNCAV dropped the age limit for the administration of this vaccine. On 11 March, CNCAV temporarily quarantined 4,257 doses from Oxford/AstraZeneca's ABV2856 batch as an "extreme precautionary measure", hours after Italy banned use of this same batch following the deaths in Sicily of two men who had been inoculated with doses from it. Romania had received 81,600 doses from the ABV2856 batch and administered most of them. Vaccination with these doses was resumed on 19 March after the European Medicines Agency (EMA) declared the Oxford/AstraZeneca vaccine safe for use. In April, EMA found a possible link between the Oxford/AstraZeneca vaccine and very rare cases of unusual blood clots with low platelet counts, although it said its benefits far outweighed the risks and did not announce any restrictions. As of 4 April, EMA received reports of 222 cases of a rare thrombosis affecting the brain or abdomen among some 34 million people in Europe who have received the Oxford/AstraZeneca jab; most occurred in women under 60 within two weeks of vaccination. As a precaution, several European countries limited the use of the Oxford/AstraZeneca vaccine to older age groups. According to Valeriu Gheorghiță, president of CNCAV, no cases of vaccine-related thrombosis had been confirmed in Romania as of 6 April; he did, however, mention seven cases of unrelated thrombosis in seven people vaccinated against COVID-19, four with Pfizer/BioNTech and three with Oxford/AstraZeneca. On 8 April, CNCAV decided to continue the vaccination with Oxford/AstraZeneca for all age groups.

Valeriu Gheorghiță announced on 9 March that the third phase of vaccination will first start rolling out in the localities with an incidence rate of at least 4.5‰. The people from nine localities – seven county seats (Alba Iulia, Baia Mare, Brașov, Cluj-Napoca, Giurgiu, Timișoara and Zalău), a municipality (Petroșani) and a commune (Sânpetru) – could schedule their appointments on the national vaccination platform before the effective start of the third phase, which was set to begin on 15 March. The authorities introduced waiting lists for appointments, however, without the possibility for people to choose the type of vaccine. In order to optimize the distribution of vaccine doses, it was decided that each vaccination center should inoculate only one type of vaccine.

On 11 March, the one-shot Janssen COVID-19 vaccine became the fourth vaccine to be conditionally approved on the EU level, arriving in Romania on 14 April. The 60,000 doses in the first batch remained in storage, as Romanian authorities waited for indications from EMA regarding the safety of the vaccine. In the US, the Centers for Disease Control and Prevention and the Food and Drug Administration recommended a temporary halt on Johnson & Johnson vaccinations in the country after the appearance of six cases of a rare and severe type of blood clot in people inoculated with this vaccine; by mid-April, more than 6.8 million doses of the Janssen vaccine have been administered in the US. EMA finally gave green light to the Janssen vaccine on 20 April, and the first doses began to be distributed to vaccination centers in Romania on 4 May.

In April, family doctors joined the vaccination teams, with first shots being administered in Timiș County. At the beginning of the month, the participation rate among family doctors was about 50–55%. On 17 April, Romania made a new donation to Moldova: 132,000 vaccine units were given to the latter. In an effort to boost rural access to the vaccine, officials launched on 21 April the first mobile vaccination centers in seven counties; in the first phase, mainly Moderna vaccine was distributed in these centers. On 24 April, the first drive-through vaccination center was inaugurated in the parking lot of Deva Shopping City. Between 23 and 26 April, Timișoara Regional Business Center hosted a three-day non-stop vaccination marathon. In the first such action in the country, 6,722 people were vaccinated by more than 500 volunteers. Other vaccination marathons soon followed in Bucharest, Cluj-Napoca, Târgu Mureș and Iași.

In the first weekend of May, walk-in vaccinations were introduced in all centers in the country, with priority for people over 60. Previously, as Oxford/AstraZeneca vaccine stockpiled throughout the country, only people interested in getting this vaccine were able to show up at the vaccination centers without prior appointment. On 2 June, authorities began immunizing children aged 12 to 15 with the Pfizer/BioNTech vaccine. Previously, on 28 May, EMA issued a recommendation for the authorization of the Pfizer/BioNTech vaccine for this age group. In the first week, almost 9,400 12-to-15-year-olds have received the vaccine, most of them in Bucharest.

On January 24, 2022, some 114,000 doses on pediatric Pfizer/BioNTech vaccine arrived in the country, for the start of the vaccination campaign of children aged between 5 and 11, which took start on January 26, 2022. The vaccination schedule for children with Comirnaty pediatric vaccine is 10 μg/dose every 21 days (instead of the 30 μg/dose for the standard Comirnaty vaccine); each dose is administered intramuscularly, similar to other eligible age groups.

On February 10, 2022, Valeriu Gheorghiță announced that 917,800 doses of the AstraZeneca vaccine have expired, and would therefore be destroyed.

=== Vaccine storage and distribution centers ===
The Ion Cantacuzino Institute in Bucharest and six military hospitals in the country are the centers where the COVID-19 vaccine is stored, as they have freezers with a large capacity that can ensure storage in the required conditions (e.g., cold chains of −80 °C).

COVID-19 vaccination in Romania (Romania)

=== Vaccine priority groups ===
Vaccination against COVID-19 in Romania is carried out in three phases, in which priority is given to medical staff, people over 65, people with chronic diseases, people with disabilities, homeless people and essential workers (lawmakers, military personnel, magistrates, teachers, commercial workers, etc.).

Phase	Priority groups	Number eligible (estimated)
I	health and social workers	160,000
II	high-risk population	5 million
II	essential workers	1.5 million
III	general population	

In early March, the Ministry of Health began publishing official data on vaccines administered at each center in the country on the government's open data portal. Data from 27 December 2020 to 5 March 2021 revealed cases of nepotism regarding the vaccination of military personnel and over 7,000 vaccinations ahead of priority groups. Apart from these, local news agencies reported numerous instances of queue-jumping occurring throughout the Romanian healthcare system, as waiting lists were vulnerable to corruption.

== Vaccination centers ==
Before the official start of the vaccination campaign, the Ministry of Health identified 899 vaccination centers throughout the country: 302 in health units for the immunization of medical staff and 597 in other spaces for phases II and III. 583 of them were operational by 30 January 2021. As of 9 March 2021, before the start of the largest phase of the vaccination campaign, 678 vaccination centers with 990 flows were active in the country; according to Valeriu Gheorghiță, the total number of vaccination centers would be 1,137. Vaccination centers have a fairly good distribution in the national territory of Romania.

== Adverse reaction reporting ==
As of 4 February 2022, adverse reactions were reported in 19,918 vaccinated people (0.121% or 1.21 reactions at 1,000 doses administered). Most of them were general reactions (fever, headache, myalgia, asthenia, urticaria, etc.). Only six severe allergic reactions were reported as of 4 February 2022. The median age of people who reported adverse reactions was 37; 63% of them were female. By manufacturer, most adverse reactions have been reported in people vaccinated with Oxford/AstraZeneca (0.72% of the total number of doses administered), followed by Moderna (0.23%), Pfizer/BioNTech (0.08%) and Johnson & Johnson (0.06%).

Between 21 December 2020 and 19 March 2021, CNCAV received five reports of death among people who received a COVID-19 vaccine. However, the National Institute of Public Health (INSP) classified them as "coincidences", ruling out any direct link between vaccination and deaths. Moreover, between 1 January and 14 March 2021, INSP recorded 89 deaths (a fatality rate of 0.002% of the people who completed the vaccination scheme) among COVID-19-positive people who previously got vaccinated; 12 of them received both doses.

== Statistics ==
=== Total number of COVID-19 vaccinations administered ===
The following chart shows the total number of doses administered.

View source data.

=== Daily number of COVID-19 vaccinations administered by manufacturer ===
The following chart shows the daily number of doses administered, broken down by vaccine manufacturer.

Percentage of vaccinated according to the vaccine received (as of 4 February 2022)
1. Pfizer/BioNTech (64.8%)
2. Johnson & Johnson (25.0%)
3. Oxford/AstraZeneca (5.23%)
4. Moderna (5.04%)
View source data.

=== COVID-19 vaccinations by county ===
Rural	36.77%
Urban	41.26%

As of 2 November 2021

County	Population	Eligible population (Note: People aged 12 or over.)	%	% of eligible population
Bucharest	1,835,258	1,604,373	54.36%	62.19%
Cluj	709,585	626,679	48.29%	54.68%
Constanța	672,142	584,779	44.13%	50.72%
Sibiu	401,301	347,115	41.94%	48.49%
Brașov	553,520	478,199	39.54%	45.77%
Ilfov	486,744	421,808	39.66%	45.77%
Timiș	705,914	619,967	39.86%	45.39%
Mureș	533,186	463,407	37.29%	42.9%
Tulcea	192,101	169,501	37.8%	42.84%
Prahova	712,447	633,667	38.05%	42.78%
Alba	323,879	286,458	37.84%	42.78%
Dolj	621,410	548,941	37.62%	42.59%
Vâlcea	348,377	313,032	37.56%	41.8%
Sălaj	209,939	181,769	35.71%	41.24%
Hunedoara	380,105	338,986	36.16%	40.55%
Argeș	575,027	510,593	35.66%	40.16%
Galați	500,213	439,544	35.13%	39.98%
Iași	792,692	675,304	33.58%	39.41%
Satu Mare	331,217	287,902	34.1%	39.23%
Bistrița-Năsăud	277,849	238,330	33.6%	39.17%
Gorj	311,985	280,429	34.72%	38.62%
Ialomița	254,405	220,564	33.44%	38.57%
Caraș-Severin	269,551	241,094	33.48%	37.43%
Dâmbovița	487,115	432,376	33.17%	37.37%
Bihor	560,203	488,610	32.39%	37.13%
Maramureș	458,636	402,084	32.43%	36.99%
Călărași	280,252	245,125	32.23%	36.85%
Arad	415,910	365,950	32.25%	36.65%
Olt	389,730	349,855	32.21%	35.88%
Teleorman	328,867	295,418	31.48%	35.04%
Brăila	285,916	255,808	31.15%	34.82%
Buzău	409,162	363,017	30.24%	34.08%
Neamț	438,460	382,275	29.56%	33.91%
Mehedinți	238,907	214,215	30.14%	33.62%
Vaslui	372,040	316,358	28.24%	33.21%
Harghita	301,465	262,290	28.11%	32.3%
Vrancea	317,567	276,700	26.73%	30.68%
Botoșani	376,562	328,484	25.96%	29.76%
Bacău	581,442	502,178	25.53%	29.56%
Giurgiu	263,263	233,159	26.13%	29.5%
Covasna	201,475	174,534	23.05%	26.61%
Suceava	623,019	529,859	22.07%	25.95%

== Efficacy ==
According to the National Center for Surveillance and Control of Communicable Diseases, between 27 December 2020 and 30 September 2021, 28,929 people (or 0.52% of all people vaccinated with the first dose) tested positive for SARS-CoV-2 after being administered the first dose of vaccine. The median time from the first dose to the date of confirmation was 14 days. During the same period, 38,604 people (or 0.84% of all people vaccinated with both doses) became infected with SARS-CoV-2 after the second dose; most were asymptomatic or mild cases. The median time from the second dose to the date of confirmation was 146 days.

A preliminary analysis of the effectiveness of vaccination against COVID-19 in February–May 2021 showed that full-dose vaccination reduces the risk of death from COVID-19 by 14 times, the risk of hospitalization and ICU admission by 12 times and the risk of SARS-CoV-2 infection by 10 times.

== Opinion polls and vaccine hesitancy ==
Similar to neighboring countries, a significant portion of the Romanian population is reluctant to get vaccinated. A recent study among Europeans aged 50+ showed that vaccine hesitant individuals are mainly adults aged 50–65 years, with lower education, and residing in Central and Eastern European countries. The most commonly cited reasons are fear of adverse reactions and distrust of the vaccine's effectiveness. In September 2020, before the launch of the first anti-COVID-19 vaccine, only 29% of Romanians in urban areas were determined to get vaccinated, but by February 2021, 51% of them said they intended to schedule a vaccination. The vaccination intention was higher among men, people over 45, people with higher education and people with high incomes in urban areas.

For a short time, in the first weeks of 2021, Romania was among the most vaccinated countries of EU. But Romania was also the first EU country to open the vaccination campaign towards the general population over 18 years and the public was immediately bombarded with some highly mediatised cases of young or middle-aged people that unexpectedly died after vaccination. Among them the most notorious cases were those of the young wife of a handball player from Dinamo Bucharest and the case of Bogdan Berki, a young student (both cases registered in May 2021). Such early unfortunate events, and many other, were instrumental in establishing a highly distrust in vaccines among the general public, despite the fact that the authorities always denied any link between such unfortunate events and the vaccines. Beside that, the coming of Omicron and the very mild Omicron waves during the winter of 2021-2022 (much milder than in the Western European countries that sported very high rates of vaccination) blocked once for all any intention regarding the vaccination and the vaccination rates abysmally plummeted by the month of March 2022.

The studies on correlation between religiosity and vaccine hesitancy are vast. On October 19, 2022, a paper appeared in the scientific journal Vaccines analyzing the correlation of prayer frequency and COVID-19 vaccine hesitancy among older adults in Europe. Though analyzing religion and spirituality is difficult, by analyzing how often people pray (prayer frequency) the authors found that "daily praying, as compared to praying 'weekly or less' or never, was mostly reported among those being vaccine-hesitant, being female, having a lower educational level, not having a partner in their household, having lower wealth, or having three diseases or more". It is a known fact that Romania is one of the most religious country in Europe, as 84% of the population considering that religion is important for them. The authors speculate that "people may be vaccine-hesitant because they believe that God will protect them (restful religious), or because they fear both the COVID-19 disease and the vaccine (crisis religious)". However, the authors also say that more studies are needed that include the role of trust in the government and in science, as those factor also strongly correlate with vaccine hesitancy. Though vaccine hesitancy appears to be stronger in central and eastern Europe compared to other European regions, it is present and positively correlated with religiosity all around the world, not just the regions analyzed, as other studies have found.

Some people believe that the anti-vaccine movement is closer to the Orthodox Church, linking the people who manifest against vaccines to divine inspiration and grace. In November 2021, Suceava County had the lowest vaccination rate in the country, and the doctor who managed the county's main hospital reported religious influence against vaccination. "Very few [priests] are pro-vaccine, and I definitely know some who are anti-vax," the doctor said. In some cases, a person's "priest, or their pastor, has advised them to not get vaccinated, just like that". One priest, during the religious service, recommended that parishioners not to be vaccinated because their tails or scales would grow, referring to the genetic changes that, he believes, are produced by the vaccine. However, other priests and high-profile clergy had been actively promoting the vaccines. One of them, Gurie, the bishop of Deva, even died of Covid in October 2021 despite being vaccinated against it since the beginner of the summer.

On February 9, 2022, a paper appeared on the scientific journal Vaccines describing the refusal of vaccination against COVID-19 in Romania as it was measurable in November 2021. The analysis revealed that, although 81% of the respondents to the survey trust the mandatory vaccines under the national scheme and 94.9% of them are jabbed with the aforementioned vaccines, a large portion of them distrust the COVID-19 vaccines and showed a high degree of susceptibility to conspiracy theories. This "fear of the vaccine" is determined by conspiracy theories, lack of medical education and fear of novelty. Main reasons invoked by people arguing the non-vaccination decision are general distrust of COVID-19 vaccines (16%), the belief that these vaccines are an experiment (12.6%) and immediate side effect (8.1%). The percentages were higher in the rural environment. In addition, 74% of the respondents do not trust the medical system and 34.7% do not trust in doctors. Most worryingly, 47% of the participants believe there is a world occult organisation that controls the world and wants to reduce the population of the Earth (44.1%). From these percentages, it follows that almost 30% of the total population of Romania believes in a conspiracy scenario. In addition, 49.8% consider that vaccination does not want to eradicate COVID-19, 40.9% believe that COVID-19 vaccines lead to infertility or death, 38.1% say the vaccines were created to reduce the aging population, 34.4% question the existence of the COVID-19 pandemic, 33.2% believe that doctors are paid to inoculate a vaccine that would help reduce Earth's population, and 13% believe in the conspiracy theory that the vaccines are intended to implant a microchip in one's body.

The study also indicates that mistrust is more likely to be directed towards the new mRNA-based types of vaccine, showing that the reluctant people who finally got vaccinated opted for one of the "classical" vaccines (Oxford–AstraZeneca or Janssen).

== See also ==
- Deployment of COVID-19 vaccines
- COVID-19 pandemic in Romania
- COVID-19 vaccination in Moldova
