= COVID-19 pandemic in Moldova =

- Disease: COVID-19
- Pathogen: SARS-CoV-2
- Location: Republic of Moldova
- First outbreak: Wuhan, China
- Index case: Chișinău
- Arrival date: 7 March 2020 (6 years, 8 months and 2 weeks)
- Confirmed cases: 656,473
- Recovered: 608,658 (updated 23 July 2023)
- Deaths: 12,290
- Fatality rate: 1.87%
- Vaccinations: 1,109,524 (total vaccinated); 1,078,961 (fully vaccinated); 2,293,086 (doses administered)

Government website
- National Agency for Public Health

The COVID-19 pandemic in Moldova was a part of the worldwide pandemic of coronavirus disease 2019 (COVID-19) caused by severe acute respiratory syndrome coronavirus 2 (SARS-CoV-2). The virus was confirmed to have reached the Republic of Moldova on 7 March 2020, when a Moldovan woman who returned from Italy tested positive for the novel coronavirus. As the number of infected people started to rise during the next days, the Parliament declared a state of emergency on 17 March 2020 for the entire territory of the Republic of Moldova for a period of 60 days (17 March to 15 May 2020).

On 15 May 2020, the last day of the state of emergency declared by the Parliament on 17 March 2020, the Extraordinary National Commission of Public Health declared the state of emergency in public health for the entire territory of Moldova for the period of 16 May to 30 June 2020. On 9 June 2020, the total number of confirmed cases surpassed 10,000. On 1 September 2020, the number of deaths surpassed 1,000.

The vaccination process started on 2 March 2021 with AstraZeneca vaccine units donated by Romania to Moldova.

== Background ==
On 12 January, the World Health Organization (WHO) confirmed that a novel coronavirus was the cause of a respiratory illness in a cluster of people in Wuhan, Hubei, China, who had initially come to the attention of the WHO on 31 December 2019.

Unlike SARS of 2003, the case fatality ratio for COVID-19 has been much lower, but the transmission has been significantly greater, with a significant total death toll.

== Timeline ==
=== Before 24 February 2020 ===
- 23 January 2020: in the context of prevention and early detection of 2019-nCoV, the management of the Ministry of Health, Labour and Social Protection and representatives of the National Agency for Public Health and the National Center for Pre-hospital Emergency Medical Assistance had a meeting with the Ambassador Extraordinary and Plenipotentiary of the People's Republic of China to the Republic of Moldova, Mr. Zhang Yinghong. During the meeting, vigilance and preventive measures related to the spread of the virus were discussed. The Ambassador showed openness to provide all the necessary information support to Moldova regarding the evolution of the new coronavirus spread and the steps taken by the Chinese authorities.
- 24 January 2020: the Ministry of Health, Labour and Social Protection issued the first press-release on the prevention and control measures related to the infection with the new type of Coronavirus (2019-nCoV). In the press-release, it was stated that the epidemiological situation at national level regarding the infection with 2019-nCoV is daily monitored by the National Agency for Public Health, and if there are suspect or detected cases of 2019-nCoV, specialized anti-epidemic teams are ready to intervene. It was also stated that the virology laboratory within the National Agency for Public Health has facilities, equipment and trained personnel for laboratory diagnosis of the most common viruses: influenza (A and B), non-influenza (RSV, Coronavirus, including MERS-CoV) and bacteria (Pneumococcus, Haemophilus influenzae type B, staphylococcus) to confirm acute respiratory infections.
- 27 January 2020: the Minister of Health, Labour and Social Protection Mrs. Viorica Dumbrăveanu convened an extended meeting of the Commission for Exceptional Situations and Public Health Emergencies of the Ministry of Health, Labour and Social Protection. This meeting was also attended by representatives of the Ministry of Foreign Affairs and European Integration, the Ministry of Internal Affairs, the Ministry of Finance, the General Inspectorate of Border Police, the Customs Service, the National Insurance Company in Medicine, the National Food Safety Agency and the National Agency for Public Health. Participants discussed the measures to prevent and control the infection with the new type Coronavirus (2019-nCov), based on the epidemiological situation and the global spread of the infection.
- 2 February 2020: the Extraordinary National Commission of Public Health was convened by the Prime Minister Mr. Ion Chicu. The commission has examined the information presented by the Ministry of Health, Labour and Social Protection and found that the epidemiological situation related to the infection with the novel Coronavirus (2019-nCoV) is tense, which has led the World Health Organization to declare a Public Health Emergency of International Concern. The commission adopted the Decision No. 1 which provides, inter alia, that risk assessment for public health will continue to be carried out with the attribution, if necessary, of the alert code resulting from the epidemiological situation related to the infection with the new Coronavirus (2019-nCoV).
- 18 February 2020: the National Agency for Public Health received from Germany, with the support of the World Health Organization, test kits to detect the virus that causes COVID-19.

=== Code yellow alert (24 February – 7 March 2020) ===
- 24 February 2020: the Extraordinary National Commission of Public Health was convened by the Prime-minister Mr. Ion Chicu. The commission adopted the Decision No. 2 which provides, inter alia, the establishment of the Code Yellow alert at national level in the context of the epidemiological situation related to COVID-19 infection and considering the possible risk for a public health emergency.
- 25 February 2020: the Republic of Moldova has put into action some anti-coronavirus measures. The Minister of Health, Labour and Social Protection, Mrs. Viorica Dumbrăveanu, convened in a meeting the representatives of the public medical-sanitary institutions, the Ministry of Internal Affairs, the General Inspectorate of Border Police and the National Center for Pre-hospital Emergency Medical Assistance. During the meeting was examined the activity of the National Agency for Public Health, in its quality of International Health Regulations (IHR) National Focal Point, regarding the control and prevention at national level of the infection with the new type of Coronavirus and the future measures to be taken. On that meeting, the Minister of Health, Labour and Social Protection declared that starting from that day (25 February 2020), the authorities will meet every day at 7:30 am and will provide information on what happened during the last 24 hours, what measures have been taken and what are the difficulties. It was decided that these meetings will take place as long as there is a risk of importing and spreading the new type of coronavirus.
- 26 February 2020: the customers of Moldovan mobile phone operators received from the Government an SMS on precautionary measures to prevent the infection with the new coronavirus. The message was the following: "Take care of your health. Call immediately your family doctor if you have a fever or cough. If you have returned from areas with Coronavirus and are feeling unwell, call 112" (the original message in Romanian: "Aveti grija de sanatate. Sunati imediat medicul de familie daca aveti febra sau tuse. Daca V-ati intors din zone cu Coronavirus si Va simtiti rau, sunati 112"). This action to inform the population was carried out at the initiative of the Ministry of Health, Labour and Social Protection, within the national information campaign on the prevention of the coronavirus infection. In order to answer to many speculations related to the question "Where does the Government get the phone numbers from?", the above-mentioned Ministry explained that this initiative was a free social action organized in partnership with the Moldovan mobile phone operators.

=== The first case (7 March 2020) ===
The first coronavirus case in the Republic of Moldova was announced on 7 March 2020. The infected person is a 48-year-old woman who had returned to Moldova from Italy with the flight Milano-Chisinau. She had been taken to hospital immediately from the plane, being in a serious condition: bilateral bronchopneumonia, acute respiratory failure, fever, cough, general weakness. She has a few chronic illnesses: diabetes, overweight and hypertension. According to the Ministry of Health, Labour and Social Protection of Moldova, she was diagnosed with bilateral bronchopneumonia, fever and cough on 4 March in Italy. She was prescribed antibiotic treatment at home and put in home quarantine pending confirmation of a new type of coronavirus infection, but she decided to return to Moldova.

=== Code orange alert (8–12 March 2020) ===
- 8 March 2020: the Extraordinary National Commission of Public Health established the Code Orange alert at national level in the context of the epidemiological situation related to COVID-19 infection.
- 10 March 2020: the Ministry of Health, Labour and Social Protection of Moldova confirmed another two cases (the 2nd and the 3rd) of coronavirus. The infected people are a woman and a man, both of them returned from Italy, on 26 February and 1 March, respectively. On the same day all foreigners coming from the countries affected by coronavirus have been banned from entering Moldova by plane.
- 11 March 2020: the 4th case has been confirmed. Government announced that it closing all kindergartens, schools, colleges and universities for two weeks.
- 12 March 2020: 2 new cases (the 5th and the 6th) were confirmed. As per 12 March 2020, there were no confirmed cases in the Transnistrian region, but 8 people were quarantined after returning from abroad.

=== Code red alert (13–16 March 2020) ===
- 13 March 2020: the Extraordinary National Commission of Public Health established the Code Red alert at national level in the context of the epidemiological situation related to COVID-19 infection. During this day other 2 new cases (the 7th and the 8th) have been confirmed.
- 14 March 2020: 4 new cases were confirmed. Thus, the total number of infected people reached 12.
- 15 March 2020: 11 new cases were confirmed. The total number of infected people reached 23.
- 16 March 2020: 6 new cases were confirmed. The total number is 29. One woman recovered.

=== State of emergency (17 March – 15 May 2020) ===
==== 17–31 March 2020 ====
- 17 March 2020: the Parliament declared the state of emergency for the entire territory of the Republic of Moldova for a period of 60 days (17 March - 15 May 2020). During 17 March 2020, the 30th case has been confirmed.
- 18 March 2020: the first death was confirmed, a 61-year-old woman who had travelled to Italy. Another 6 new cases of infection have been confirmed.
- 19 March 2020: 13 new cases were confirmed. The total number of infected people since 7 March 2020 reached 49.
- 20 March 2020: 17 new cases were confirmed, and the total number of infected people since 7 March 2020 reached 66. Upon the request of MoH, based on WHO Moldova recommendations short-list, Trimetrica LLC /www.trimetrica.com/ (ESRI Partner in Moldova) launched the customized ArcGIS Dashboard (an online platform) - allowing the real-time monitoring of COVID-19 cases in the Republic of Moldova. It's updated for 2 times per day. The platform is accessible at this link: gismoldova.maps.arcgis.com
- 21 March 2020: 14 new cases were confirmed, the total number of infected people since 7 March 2020 reaching 80. Out of these 14 new cases, 2 cases were recorded for the first time in the Transnistrian region. At the same time, it was announced that the first person infected and confirmed in the Republic of Moldova (on 7 March 2020), was treated and transferred to another section for recovery against other chronic diseases. Thus, the number of recovered persons reached 2.
- 27 March 2020: the second death was confirmed, a 79 years old woman who was a doctor working at the Emergency Medical Assistance Service. She got sick on 19 March, and on 24 March she was admitted to the Republican Clinical Hospital, in serious condition. The patient had several previous chronic diseases (diabetes, heart failure, high blood pressure). During 27 March 2020, 22 new cases were confirmed, the total number of infected people since 7 March 2020 reaching 199. On the same day, 3 patients recovered, the total number of recoveries reaching 5.
- 29 March 2020: the third death was confirmed, a woman from the Transnistrian region of Moldova.
- 31 March 2020: after 280 tests were performed, a record number of 55 new cases were confirmed, of which 48 cases were with local transmission, while 7 were import cases (of which 6 were from the United Kingdom and 1 from Austria). Thus, the total number of infected persons since 7 March 2020 reached 353. At the same time, 4 patients were treated and discharged from hospitals, the total number of recoveries reaching 22. Also, during 31 March 2020 the fourth death was confirmed, a man from the Briceni District of the Republic of Moldova.

==== April 2020 ====
- 1 April 2020: the fifth death was confirmed, a person from the Transnistrian region.
- 2 April 2020: the sixth death was confirmed, a 53-year-old person from Ștefan Vodă District, which was hospitalized in a hospital from Chișinău. The patient also had other chronic diseases.
- 27 April 2020: the quarantine regime in the Carahasani village of the Ştefan Vodă District (established on 1 April 2020) was lifted.

==== 1–15 May 2020 ====
- 9 May 2020: during this day, 1254 new tests, both primary and repeated, were performed. As a result, 139 new cases, all with local transmission, were registered, and thus, the total number of infected persons since 7 March 2020 reached 4867. The territorial distribution of these new cases was the following: Chisinau Municipality - 42; Transnistrian region - 16; Cahul District - 8; Balti Municipality - 7; Ungheni District - 7; Gagauzia Autonomous Territorial Unit - 6 (all in Ceadir-Lunga District); Soroca District - 6; Edinet District - 5; Ocnita District - 5; Straseni District - 5; Ialoveni District - 4; Anenii Noi District - 3; Căușeni District - 3; Criuleni District - 3; Dubăsari District - 3; Rezina District - 3; Basarabeasca District - 2; Fălești District - 2; Hîncești District - 2; Orhei District - 2; Călărași District - 1; Leova District - 1; Rîșcani District - 1; Ștefan-Vodă District - 1; Telenești District - 1. Of the total number of the new registered cases in this day, 25 were employees of medical institutions: doctors - 6, nurses - 14, support staff - 5. Also, 9 deaths were registered during that day (the highest daily fatality since the first case was registered in Moldova on 7 March 2020), and thus, the total number of deaths reached 161.
- 15 May 2020: 1344 tests were performed during this day (1117 primary tests and 227 repeated tests). As a result, 192 new cases were registered and thus, the total number of infected persons since 7 March 2020 reached 5745. Of the total number of the new registered cases, 18 were employees of medical institutions: doctors - 5, nurses - 8, support staff - 5. On the same day, 52 persons recovered (the total number of recoveries reached 2280) and 8 persons died (the total number of deaths reached 202).

The Extraordinary National Commission of Public Health adopted the Decision No. 10 which provided the following:

1. The state of emergency in public health is declared for the entire territory of the Republic of Moldova for the period 16 May - 30 June 2020, with the possibility to extend this period depending on the evolution of the epidemiological situation.
2. The Ministry of Health, Labour and Social Protection and the National Agency for Public Health are designated as the responsible public authorities to manage the public health emergency.
3. The decisions of the Extraordinary National Commission of Public Health are mandatory for the authorities of the central and local public administration, for the legal and natural persons, regardless of the field of activity and the legal organisational form.
4. Non-compliance with the provisions/measures established by the National Commission of Public Health is a danger for the public health and will serve as a basis for the prosecution of administrative offences or criminal offences.

=== State of emergency in public health (since 16 May 2020) ===
==== Since 16 May 2020 ====
- 16 May 2020: 1429 tests were performed during this day (1180 primary tests and 249 repeated tests). As a result, 189 new cases were registered and thus, the total number of infected persons since 7 March 2020 reached 5934. Of the total number of the new registered cases, 30 were employees of medical institutions: doctors - 9, nurses - 13, support staff - 8. On the same day, 64 persons recovered (the total number of recoveries reached 2344) and 5 persons died (the total number of deaths reached 207).

== Vaccination ==
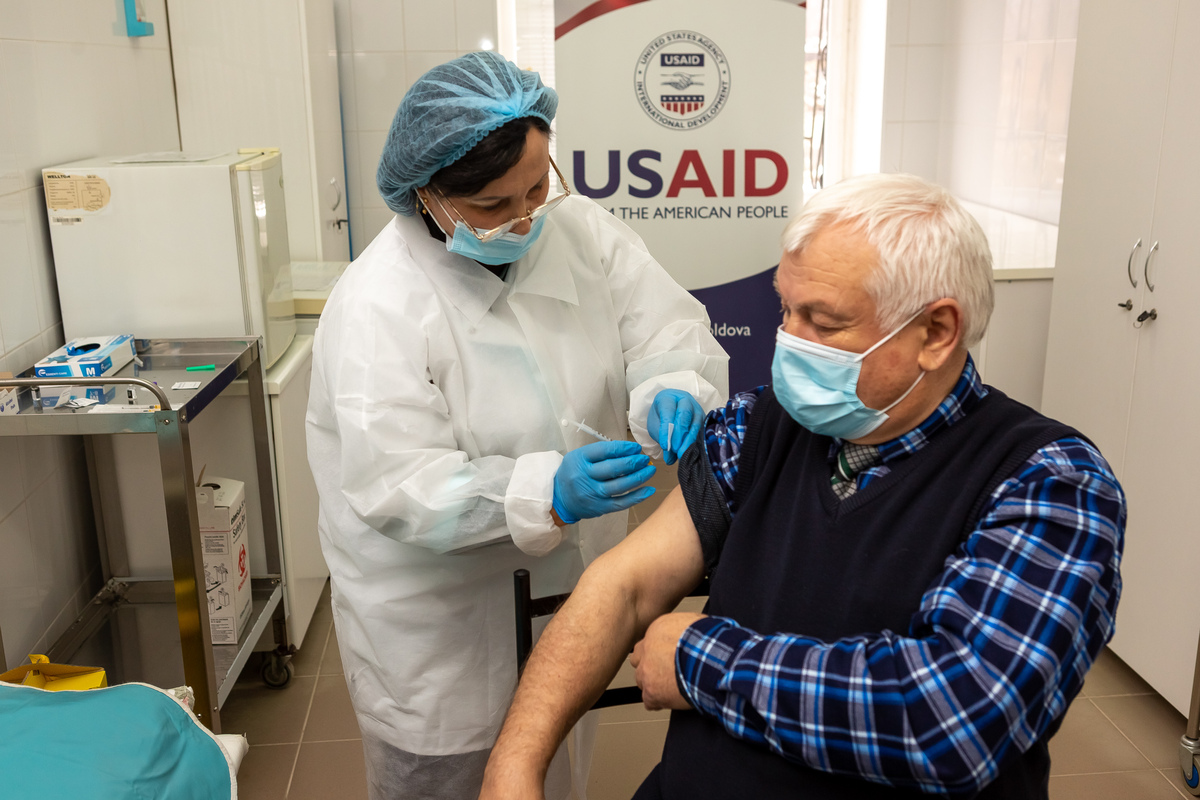
A Moldovan receives a Pfizer vaccine donated by the United States as part of the COVAX initiative in 2022

Moldova started its vaccination campaign on 2 March 2021 after it received 21,600 units of the Oxford–AstraZeneca COVID-19 vaccine from a donation by Romania given on 27 February 2021. This country had already promised Moldova on 29 December 2020 that it would gift it a total of 200,000 vaccine doses as part of a collaboration project regarding the COVID-19 pandemic and other topics between Moldova and Romania. 1,810 of the vaccines that Romania donated were used in Transnistria as well. Moldova would also receive some 14,400 Oxford–AstraZeneca vaccine doses through the COVAX program for helping poor countries acquire COVID-19 vaccine units on 5 March 2021, becoming the first European country to do so. Moldova received further donations from Romania on 27 March 2021 (50,400 vaccine units), on 17 April 2021 (132,000 vaccine doses) and on 7 May 2021 (100,800 vaccine doses).

The country was also donated 2,000 Sinopharm BIBP vaccine units from the United Arab Emirates (UAE) on 13 March 2021, 71,000 vaccine doses from Russia in two occasions (24 April 2021 and 30 April 2021) and 150,000 vaccine units from China on 27 April 2021. Moldova also ordered 100,000 vaccine doses from China to buy them, and they arrived at the same day as those that were donated.

== Statistics ==
Important notice: as mentioned by the Minister of Health, Labour and Social Protection of the Republic of Moldova on 25 April 2020, the number of recoveries reported by the authorities of the Republic of Moldova includes only the persons from the medical institutions that are controlled by the constitutional authorities of the Republic of Moldova, and does not include persons that recovered in the Transnistrian region of Moldova. Therefore, the real number of recoveries shall be bigger than the number reflected in the charts below. Also, as the number of active cases is calculated by excluding from confirmed cases the number of recoveries and deaths, the real number of active cases shall be smaller than the number reflected in the charts below.

=== No. of new primary tests performed per day ===
Source of data for the number of daily tests: for 8–14 and 16 March 2020: the report of the Minister of Health, Labour and Social Protection presented at the press-conference on 1 May 2020; for 15, 17, 25 and 26 March 2020, 28 March - 6 April 2020 and since 8 April 2020 - the press releases of the Minister of Health, Labour and Social Protection of the Republic of Moldova; for 18–24 March 2020 the number of daily performed tests was announced in the daily press conferences after the meetings of the Single Command Center for the management of the crisis triggered by COVID-19 (the press conferences are available at www.privesc.eu and www.realitatealive.md).

=== Total number of cases by age ===
(Confirmed during 7 March - 22 August 2020)

=== Total number of cases by age and sex ===
(Confirmed during 7 March - 22 August 2020)

=== Total number of cases by sex, in % ===
(Confirmed during 7 March - 22 August 2020)

=== Total number of cases: women ===
(Confirmed during 7 March - 22 August 2020)

Pregnant women	259 cases (1.33%)
Non-pregnant women	19204 cases (98.67%)
All women	19463 cases (100.00%)

=== Total number of cases by type of transmission ===
(Confirmed during 7 March - 23 August 2020)

Imported cases	319 cases (0.95%)
Local transmission cases	33159 cases (99.05%)
All cases	33478 cases (100.00%)

=== Total number of deaths by age ===
(Confirmed during 7 March - 22 August 2020)

=== Total number of deaths by age and sex ===
(Confirmed during 7 March - 22 August 2020)

=== Total number of deaths by sex, in % ===
(Confirmed during 7 March - 22 August 2020)

=== The daily evolution ===
Note: Imp. = import cases; Loc. = local transmission cases; Susp. = suspected cases; n/a = data is not available.

Date of reporting	Primary tests		Confirmed cases						Recoveries		Death		Active	Susp.
Date of reporting	New	Total	New			Total			New	Total	New	Total	Active	Susp.
Date of reporting	New	Total	Imp.	Loc.	Imp.+ Loc.	Imp.	Loc.	Imp.+ Loc.	New	Total	New	Total	Active	Susp.
2020-03-07			1	0	1	1	0	1	0	0	0	0	1	n/a
2020-03-08	3	3	0	0	0	1	0	1	0	0	0	0	1	n/a
2020-03-09	4	7	0	0	0	1	0	1	0	0	0	0	1	n/a
2020-03-10	8	15			2			3	0	0	0	0	3	13
2020-03-11	30	45			1			4	0	0	0	0	4	22
2020-03-12	30	75			2			6	0	0	0	0	6	30
2020-03-13	33	108			2			8	0	0	0	0	8	20
2020-03-14	47	155			4			12	0	0	0	0	12	25
2020-03-15	49	204			11			23	0	0	0	0	23	27
2020-03-16	27	231			6			29	1	1	0	0	28	20
2020-03-17	47	277			1			30	0	1	0	0	29	40
2020-03-18	63	340			6			36	0	1	1	1	34	96
2020-03-19	95	435			13			49	0	1	0	1	47	108
2020-03-20	90	525			17			66	0	1	0	1	64	n/a
2020-03-21	111	636			14			80	1	2	0	1	77	106
2020-03-22	124	760			14			94	0	2	0	1	91	104
2020-03-23	115	875			15			109	0	2	0	1	106	97
2020-03-24	104	979			16			125	0	2	0	1	122	119
2020-03-25	153	1132			24			149	0	2	0	1	146	116
2020-03-26	134	1266			28			177	0	2	0	1	174	n/a
2020-03-27	128	1394			22			199	3	5	1	2	192	134
2020-03-28	231	1625			32			231	6	11	0	2	218	135
2020-03-29	246	1871			32			263	2	13	1	3	247	110
2020-03-30	169	2040			35			298	5	18	0	3	277	108
2020-03-31	280	2320			55			353	4	22	1	4	327	66
Date of reporting	Primary tests		Confirmed cases						Recoveries		Death		Active	Susp.
Date of reporting	New	Total	New			Total			New	Total	New	Total	Active	Susp.
Date of reporting	New	Total	Imp.	Loc.	Imp.+ Loc.	Imp.	Loc.	Imp.+ Loc.	New	Total	New	Total	Active	Susp.
2020-04-01	329	2649			70			423	1	23	1	5	395	67
2020-04-02	332	2981			82			505	2	25	1	6	474	n/a
2020-04-03	419	3400			86			591	0	25	2	8	558	192
2020-04-04	681	4081			161			752	4	29	4	12	711	n/a
2020-04-05	349	4430			112			864	1	30	3	15	819	188
2020-04-06	192	4622			101			965	7	37	4	19	909	155
2020-04-07	510	5132			91			1056	3	40	3	22	994	215
2020-04-08	629	5761			118			1174	3	43	5	27	1104	200
2020-04-09	534	6295			115			1289	7	50	2	29	1210	190
2020-04-10	568	6863			149			1438	6	56	0	29	1353	246
2020-04-11	598	7461			122			1560	19	75	1	30	1455	129
2020-04-12	439	7900			102			1662	19	94	2	32	1536	96
2020-04-13	273	8173			50			1712	13	107	4	36	1569	74
2020-04-14	465	8638			87			1799	27	134	4	40	1625	136
2020-04-15	594	9232			115			1914	37	171	6	46	1697	117
2020-04-16	640	9872			105			2019	64	235	8	54	1730	172
2020-04-17	549	10421			110			2129	41	276	2	56	1797	132
2020-04-18	726	11147			153			2282	115	391	4	60	1831	159
2020-04-19	640	11787			190			2472	66	457	7	67	1948	63
2020-04-20	199	11986			76			2548	21	478	3	70	2000	60
2020-04-21	241	12227			66			2614	27	505	3	73	2036	113
2020-04-22	696	12923			164			2778	55	560	3	76	2142	145
2020-04-23	792	13715			148			2926	101	661	4	80	2185	116
2020-04-24	857	14572			184			3110	94	755	7	87	2268	140
2020-04-25	1024	15596			194			3304	70	825	7	94	2385	140
2020-04-26	594	16190			104			3408	70	895	2	96	2417	108
2020-04-27	367	16557			73			3481	30	925	6	102	2454	107
2020-04-28	695	17252			157			3638	50	975	5	107	2556	162
2020-04-29	801	18053			133			3771	139	1114	4	111	2546	116
2020-04-30	878	18931			126			3897	68	1182	8	119	2596	139
Date of reporting	Primary tests		Confirmed cases						Recoveries		Death		Active	Susp.
Date of reporting	New	Total	New			Total			New	Total	New	Total	Active	Susp.
Date of reporting	New	Total	Imp.	Loc.	Imp.+ Loc.	Imp.	Loc.	Imp.+ Loc.	New	Total	New	Total	Active	Susp.
2020-05-01	801	19732			83			3980	90	1272	3	122	2586	142
2020-05-02	371	20103			72			4052	62	1334	2	124	2594	108
2020-05-03	368	20471			69			4121	48	1382	1	125	2614	147
2020-05-04	696	21167			127			4248	41	1423	7	132	2693	95
2020-05-05	924	22091			115			4363	121	1544	4	136	2683	138
2020-05-06	775	22866			113			4476	114	1658	7	143	2675	145
2020-05-07	739	23605			129			4605	89	1747	2	145	2713	159
2020-05-08	874	24479	2	121	123	148	4580	4728	79	1826	7	152	2750	180
2020-05-09	986	25465	0	139	139	148	4719	4867	99	1925	9	161	2781	181
2020-05-10	420	25885	0	60	60	148	4779	4927	33	1958	8	169	2800	132
2020-05-11	373	26258	0	68	68	148	4847	4995	22	1980	7	176	2839	129
2020-05-12	780	27038	0	159	159	148	5006	5154	89	2069	6	182	2903	187
2020-05-13	1086	28124	1	251	252	149	5257	5406	107	2176	3	185	3045	199
2020-05-14	892	29016	2	145	147	151	5402	5553	52	2228	9	194	3131	184
2020-05-15	1117	30133	1	191	192	152	5593	5745	52	2280	8	202	3263	197
2020-05-16	1180	31313	0	189	189	152	5782	5934	64	2344	5	207	3383	164
2020-05-17	749	32062	0	126	126	152	5908	6060	64	2408	4	211	3441	131
2020-05-18	360	32422	1	77	78	153	5985	6138	17	2425	6	217	3496	125
2020-05-19	1070	33492	1	201	202	154	6186	6340	83	2508	4	221	3611	197
2020-05-20	1238	34730	1	212	213	155	6398	6553	445	2953	7	228	3372	167
2020-05-21	1046	35776	0	151	151	155	6549	6704	136	3089	5	233	3382	178
2020-05-22	1028	36804	0	143	143	155	6692	6847	280	3369	4	237	3241	203
2020-05-23	989	37793	1	146	147	156	6838	6994	83	3452	5	242	3300	165
2020-05-24	599	38392	1	98	99	157	6936	7093	261	3713	8	250	3130	152
2020-05-25	383	38775	1	53	54	158	6989	7147	89	3802	11	261	3084	125
2020-05-26	833	39608	0	158	158	158	7147	7305	82	3884	7	268	3153	191
2020-05-27	1289	40897	2	230	232	160	7377	7537	91	3975	6	274	3288	214
2020-05-28	1231	42128	0	188	188	160	7565	7725	148	4123	8	282	3320	146
2020-05-29	1028	43156	0	171	171	160	7736	7896	155	4278	6	288	3330	159
2020-05-30	1281	44437	1	201	202	161	7937	8098	177	4455	3	291	3352	220
2020-05-31	673	45110	2	151	153	163	8088	8251	126	4581	4	295	3375	194
Date of reporting	Primary tests		Confirmed cases						Recoveries		Death		Active	Susp.
Date of reporting	New	Total	New			Total			New	Total	New	Total	Active	Susp.
Date of reporting	New	Total	Imp.	Loc.	Imp.+ Loc.	Imp.	Loc.	Imp.+ Loc.	New	Total	New	Total	Active	Susp.
2020-06-01	639	45749	1	108	109	164	8196	8360	41	4622	10	305	3433	169
2020-06-02	1093	46842	1	187	188	165	8383	8548	116	4738	2	307	3503	189
2020-06-03	1405	48247	0	247	247	165	8630	8795	125	4863	3	310	3622	178
2020-06-04	1173	49420	0	223	223	165	8853	9018	146	5009	5	315	3694	292
2020-06-05	1296	50716	0	229	229	165	9082	9247	231	5240	8	323	3684	292
2020-06-06	1247	51963	0	264	264	165	9346	9511	210	5450	8	331	3730	212
2020-06-07	685	52648	0	189	189	165	9535	9700	188	5638	10	341	3721	166
2020-06-08	404	53052	2	105	107	167	9640	9807	100	5738	12	353	3716	165
2020-06-09	664	53716	0	218	218	167	9858	10025	59	5797	12	365	3863	215
2020-06-10	1192	54908	0	296	296	167	10154	10321	133	5930	6	371	4020	262
2020-06-11	1399	56307	1	405	406	168	10559	10727	142	6072	4	375	4280	235
2020-06-12	1404	57711	3	363	366	171	10922	11093	157	6229	10	385	4479	250
2020-06-13	1426	59137	0	366	366	171	11288	11459	192	6421	13	398	4640	231
2020-06-14	842	59979	2	279	281	173	11567	11740	202	6623	8	406	4711	215
2020-06-15	545	60524	0	139	139	173	11706	11879	171	6794	5	411	4674	175
2020-06-16	1483	62007	2	373	375	175	12079	12254	107	6901	12	423	4930	247
2020-06-17	1659	63666	2	476	478	177	12555	12732	176	7077	10	433	5222	230
2020-06-18	1337	65003	7	367	374	184	12922	13106	175	7252	11	444	5410	227
2020-06-19	1651	66654	0	450	450	184	13372	13556	273	7525	6	450	5581	245
2020-06-20	1586	68240	1	396	397	185	13768	13953	220	7745	14	464	5744	220
2020-06-21	846	69086	0	247	247	185	14015	14200	151	7896	9	473	5831	220
2020-06-22	881	69967	0	163	163	185	14178	14363	123	8019	7	480	5864	153
2020-06-23	1319	71286	1	350	351	186	14528	14714	193	8212	10	490	6012	203
2020-06-24	1547	72833	1	363	364	187	14891	15078	188	8400	5	495	6183	230
2020-06-25	1456	74289	3	372	375	190	15263	15453	199	8599	7	502	6352	200
2020-06-26	1346	75635	0	323	323	190	15586	15776	166	8765	13	515	6496	198
2020-06-27	1607	77242	1	303	304	191	15889	16080	198	8963	6	521	6596	177
2020-06-28	706	77948	0	170	170	191	16059	16250	118	9081	9	530	6639	127
2020-06-29	563	78511	1	106	107	192	16165	16357	148	9229	6	536	6592	150
2020-06-30	1237	79748	0	256	256	192	16421	16613	153	9382	9	545	6686	207
Date of reporting	Primary tests		Confirmed cases						Recoveries		Death		Active	Susp.
Date of reporting	New	Total	New			Total			New	Total	New	Total	Active	Susp.
Date of reporting	New	Total	Imp.	Loc.	Imp.+ Loc.	Imp.	Loc.	Imp.+ Loc.	New	Total	New	Total	Active	Susp.
2020-07-01	1513	81261	1	284	285	193	16705	16898	212	9594	4	549	6755	178
2020-07-02	1398	82659	4	248	252	197	16953	17150	252	9846	11	560	6744	201
2020-07-03	1320	83979	2	293	295	199	17246	17445	247	10093	13	573	6779	209
2020-07-04	1326	85305	1	226	227	200	17472	17672	303	10396	7	580	6696	199
2020-07-05	604	85909	0	142	142	200	17614	17814	322	10718	5	585	6511	157
2020-07-06	557	86466	1	91	92	201	17705	17906	329	11047	10	595	6264	131
2020-07-07	1040	87506	4	231	235	205	17936	18141	194	11241	8	603	6297	206
2020-07-08	1285	88791	1	329	330	206	18265	18471	308	11549	11	614	6308	160
2020-07-09	1176	89967	1	194	195	207	18459	18666	387	11936	10	624	6106	174
2020-07-10	1254	91221	0	258	258	207	18717	18924	252	12188	11	635	6101	182
2020-07-11	1149	92370	2	282	284	209	18999	19208	268	12456	5	640	6112	196
2020-07-12	743	93113	0	174	174	209	19173	19382	211	12667	2	642	6073	137
2020-07-13	388	93501	0	57	57	209	19230	19439	126	12793	7	649	5997	147
2020-07-14	1227	94728	1	268	269	210	19498	19708	240	13033	6	655	6020	219
2020-07-15	1434	96162	5	327	332	215	19825	20040	265	13298	4	659	6083	197
2020-07-16	1280	97442	0	224	224	215	20049	20264	342	13640	7	666	5958	195
2020-07-17	1166	98608	4	226	230	219	20275	20494	273	13913	9	675	5906	268
2020-07-18	1411	100019	4	296	300	223	20571	20794	270	14183	5	680	5931	196
2020-07-19	692	100711	1	185	186	224	20756	20980	193	14376	4	684	5920	186
2020-07-20	557	101268	1	134	135	225	20890	21115	91	14467	10	694	5954	180
2020-07-21	1211	102479	1	326	327	226	21216	21442	132	14599	13	707	6136	233
2020-07-22	1411	103890	0	356	356	226	21572	21798	257	14856	5	712	6230	235
2020-07-23	1328	105218	3	304	307	229	21876	22105	318	15174	7	719	6212	200
2020-07-24	1317	106535	5	373	378	234	22249	22483	233	15407	7	726	6350	216
2020-07-25	1378	107913	1	344	345	235	22593	22828	201	15608	6	732	6488	216
2020-07-26	772	108685	3	203	206	238	22796	23034	301	15909	3	735	6390	169
2020-07-27	657	109342	1	119	120	239	22915	23154	245	16154	13	748	6252	162
2020-07-28	1333	110675	5	362	367	244	23277	23521	308	16462	5	753	6306	205
2020-07-29	1577	112252	3	423	426	247	23700	23947	323	16785	6	759	6403	248
2020-07-30	1536	113788	3	393	396	250	24093	24343	255	17040	12	771	6532	215
2020-07-31	1629	115417	2	388	390	252	24481	24733	229	17269	7	778	6686	194
Date of reporting	Primary tests		Confirmed cases						Recoveries		Death		Active	Susp.
Date of reporting	New	Total	New			Total			New	Total	New	Total	Active	Susp.
Date of reporting	New	Total	Imp.	Loc.	Imp.+ Loc.	Imp.	Loc.	Imp.+ Loc.	New	Total	New	Total	Active	Susp.
2020-08-01	1815	117232	2	378	380	254	24859	25113	302	17571	10	788	6754	220
2020-08-02	742	117974	1	248	249	255	25107	25362	245	17816	3	791	6755	173
2020-08-03	537	118511	0	120	120	255	25227	25482	126	17942	9	800	6740	145
2020-08-04	1698	120209	3	329	332	258	25556	25814	225	18167	10	810	6837	202
2020-08-05	1562	121771	4	404	408	262	25960	26222	251	18418	13	823	6981	225
2020-08-06	1754	123525	5	401	406	267	26361	26628	258	18676	5	828	7124	246
2020-08-07	1990	125515	6	356	362	273	26717	26990	242	18918	7	835	7237	234
2020-08-08	1872	127387	2	451	453	275	27168	27443	182	19100	6	841	7502	234
2020-08-09	777	128164	2	215	217	277	27383	27660	200	19300	4	845	7515	155
2020-08-10	921	129085	2	179	181	279	27562	27841	165	19465	5	850	7526	131
Date of reporting	New	Total	Imp.	Loc.	Imp.+ Loc.	Imp.	Loc.	Imp.+ Loc.	New	Total	New	Total	Active	Susp.
Date of reporting	New	Total	New			Total			New	Total	New	Total	Active	Susp.
Date of reporting	Primary tests		Confirmed cases						Recoveries		Death		Active	Susp.

== See also ==
- Moldovan–Romanian collaboration during the COVID-19 pandemic
- COVID-19 pandemic by country and territory
- COVID-19 pandemic in Europe
- COVID-19 pandemic in Romania
- COVID-19 pandemic in Ukraine
