= COVID-19 pandemic in Ukraine =

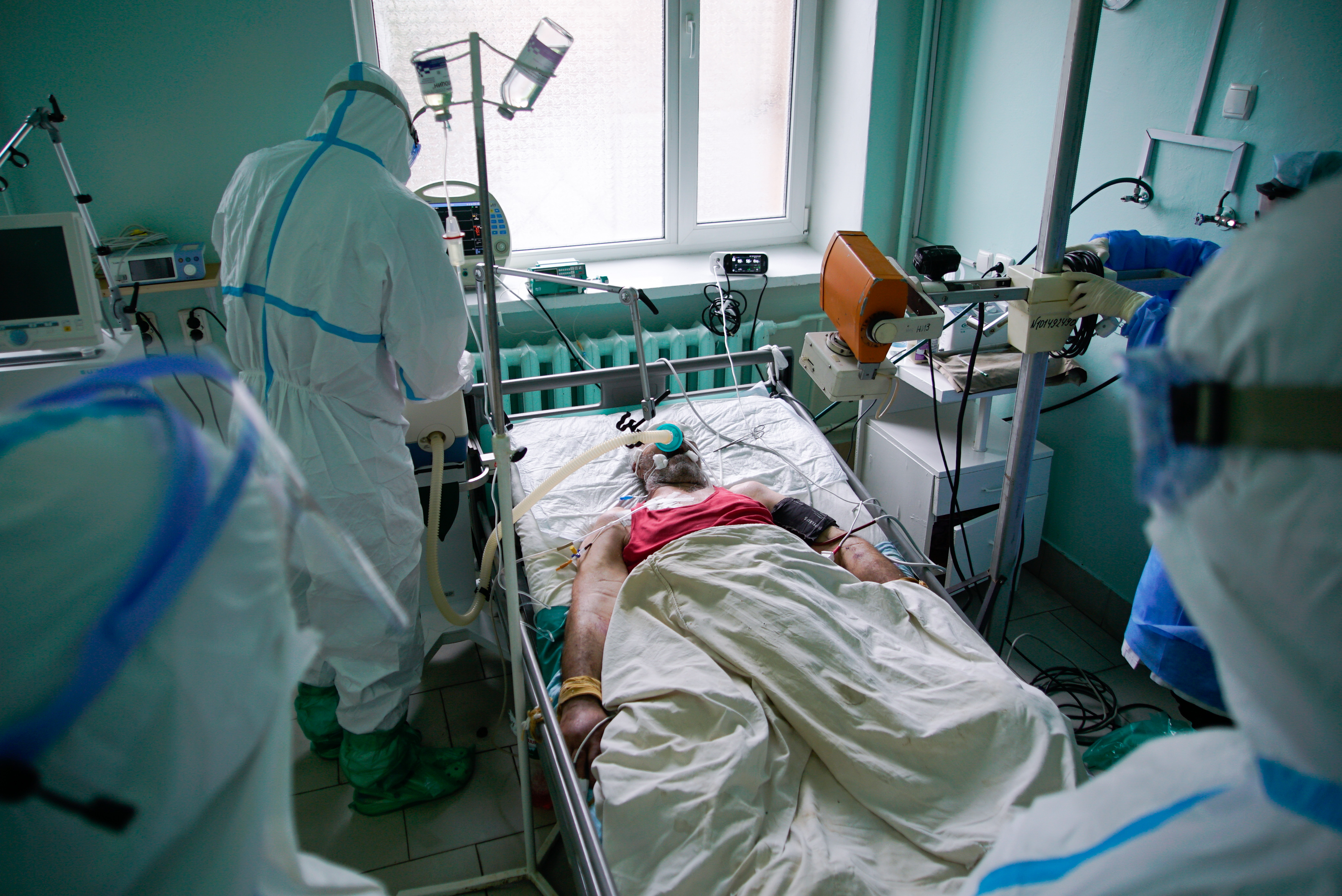
- A COVID-19 patient in a severe state in Chernivtsi in May 2020
- Disease: COVID-19
- Pathogen: SARS-CoV-2
- Location: Ukraine
- First outbreak: Wuhan, Hubei, China (globally); Italy, Romania, Egypt (locally)
- Index case: Chernivtsi Oblast
- Arrival date: 3 March 2020 (6 years, 5 months and 19 days)
- Confirmed cases: 5,555,510
- Recovered: 3,483,354
- Deaths: 109,937
- Fatality rate: 1.98%
- Vaccinations: 16,267,198 (total vaccinated); 15,741,036 (fully vaccinated); 35,735,490 (doses administered)

Government website
- covid19.gov.ua

The COVID-19 pandemic in Ukraine has resulted in 5,555,510 confirmed cases of COVID-19 and 109,937 deaths.

The virus was confirmed to have spread to Ukraine when the country's first case was confirmed to be hospitalized in Chernivtsi Oblast on 3 March 2020, a man who had travelled from Italy to Romania by plane and then arrived in Ukraine by car. An emergency was declared on 20 March 2020 in Kyiv Oblast, Chernivtsi Oblast, Zhytomyr Oblast, Dnipropetrovsk Oblast, Ivano-Frankivsk Oblast, and the city of Kyiv. New infections and deaths started to break records by late October 2021. By then, a total of 2.8 million coronavirus cases and 64,936 COVID-19 related deaths had occurred in Ukraine.

Ukraine's ongoing vaccination program started on 24 February 2021 and from that day to 12 September 2021, 10,710,944 vaccinations were given in Ukraine (meaning 18% of the adult population of Ukraine had been vaccinated against COVID-19). About 44% of those vaccinated had been fully vaccinated. In an August 2021 poll 56% of Ukrainians did not plan to be vaccinated. Demand for vaccinations multiplied sharply by late October 2021. On 7 January 2022 the Ministry of Health announced that 44.9% of the adult population had undergone a full course of vaccination.

Statistics for the Russian-held Autonomous Republic of Crimea and city of Sevastopol, and for the unrecognized Donetsk People's Republic and Luhansk People's Republic in eastern Ukraine, are not reported by Ukraine's state agencies, and are not included in the country's totals.

Since the start of the Russian invasion of Ukraine, the Ukrainian Ministry of Healthcare has made no further press releases related to COVID-19, and the latest counts were for 23 February 2022. As a result, daily counts are displayed in various diagrams as zero. In late May 2022, Chief State Sanitary Doctor Ihor Kuzin stated that since the beginning of the invasion, more than 750 studies had been conducted and that COVID-19 outbreaks were not expected in Ukraine in the near future. On 1 July 2023, the Ministry downgraded the disease's alert levels to that of regular respiratory diseases and lifted all emergency measures relating to it.

== Background ==
On 12 January, the World Health Organization (WHO) confirmed that a novel coronavirus was the cause of a respiratory illness in a cluster of people in Wuhan, Hubei, China, who had initially come to the attention of the WHO on 31 December 2019.

Unlike SARS of 2003, the case fatality ratio for COVID-19 has been much lower, but the transmission has been significantly greater, with a significant total death toll.

== Timeline ==
Cases

Deaths

=== January 2020 ===
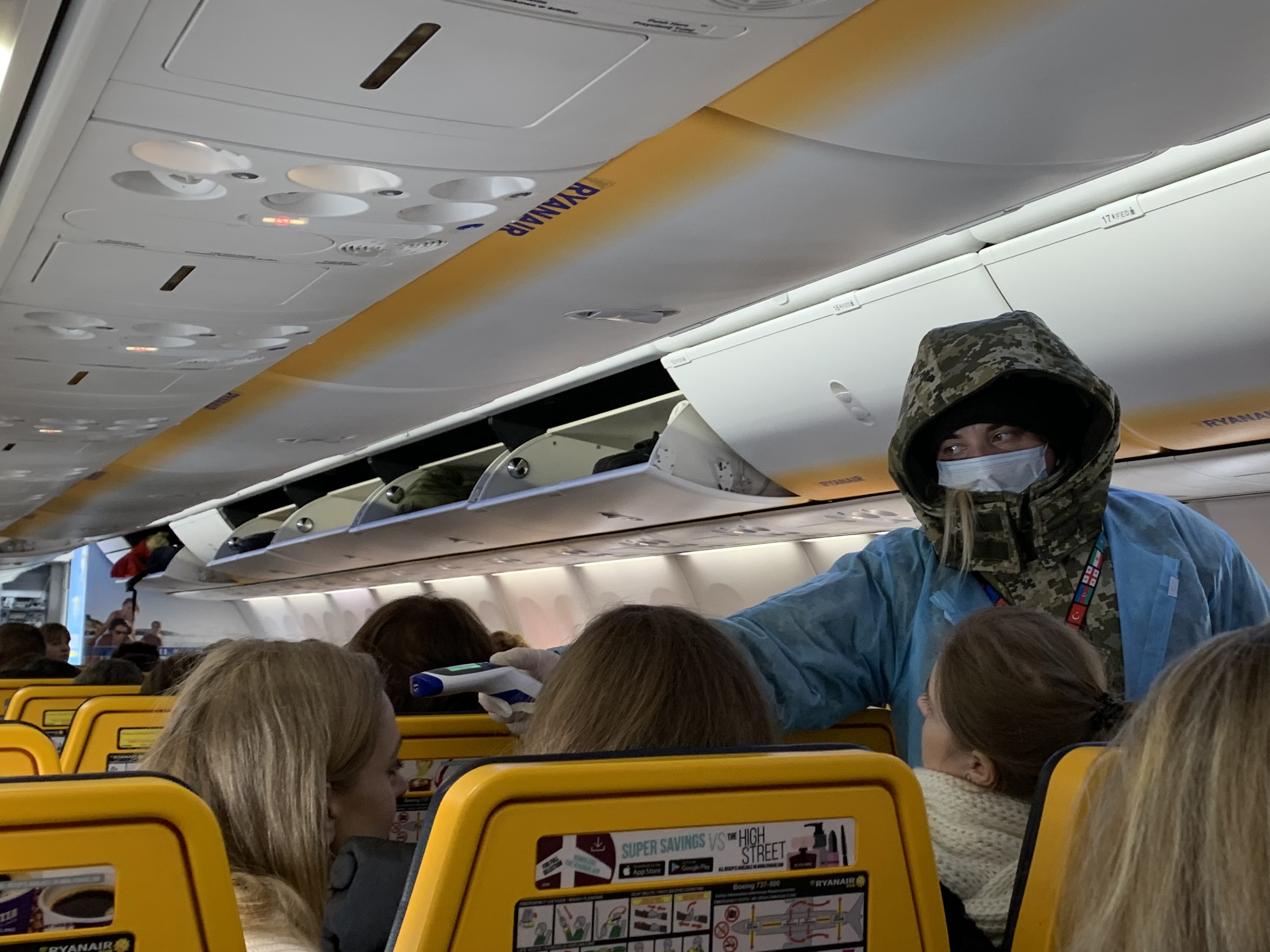
Staff monitoring passengers' body temperature on board a plane in Boryspil International Airport.

On 27 January 2020, SkyUp, a Ukrainian low-cost charter airline, announced that it had suspended flights to Sanya, in Hainan, China until March.

=== February 2020 ===
On 4 February, Ukraine International Airlines suspended its charter service to Sanya Phoenix International Airport in Hainan. Initially, the suspension was set to last until 24 February, however the airline has not yet indicated when it will resume flights.

On 24 February, Boryspil International Airport and Kyiv International Airport were supposed to implement thermal screening procedures for travellers from Italy, but airport staff were either underequipped (with thermal cameras) or ignored the protocol.

=== March 2020 ===
On 3 March, Ukraine announced its first confirmed SARS-CoV-2 case, a man who had travelled from Italy to Romania by plane and then arrived in Ukraine by car.

On 12 March, two more SARS-CoV-2 cases were confirmed in Ukraine. The diagnosis was confirmed for a man in Chernivtsi Oblast, whose wife had recently returned from Italy, and for a 71-year-old woman in Zhytomyr Oblast, who had returned from Poland on 1 March. The woman, from Radomyshl, in Zhytomyr Oblast, died on 13 March, becoming the first fatal case in the country.

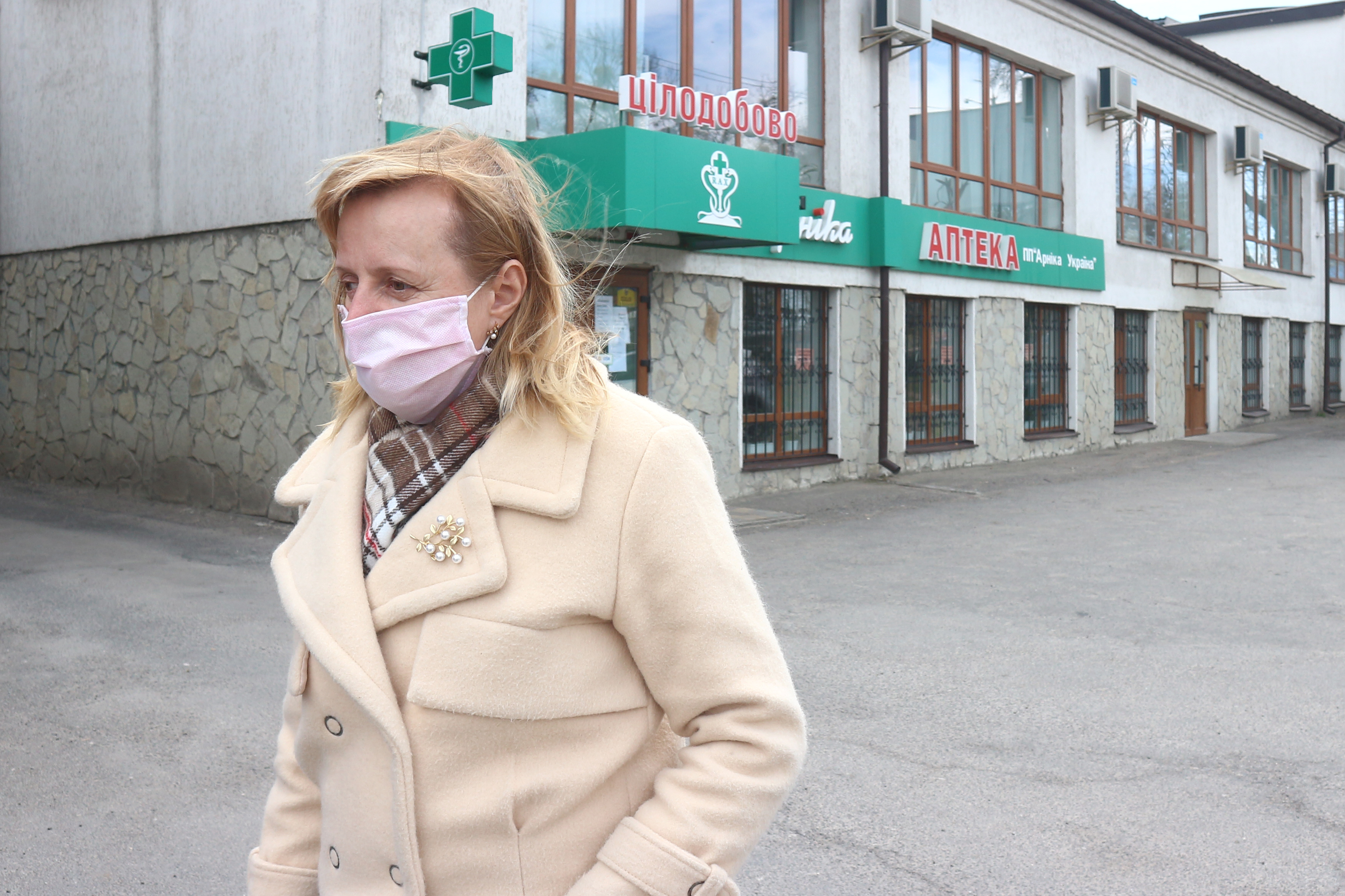
Wearing a face mask in public places was made obligatory in Ukraine on 6 April 2020

On 16 March, two new cases were confirmed in Chernivtsi Oblast, and two others in Kyiv. In Kyiv, one of the persons concerned was a student who had contacted the infected woman in Zhytomyr Oblast, while the other was a woman who had returned from France.

On 17 March, six more cases were confirmed in Chernivtsi Oblast, all of them had contacted the previously known case, including a 33-year-old woman who died. The first cases of children being infected were reported. One case was confirmed in Kyiv Oblast, a man who had recently come from abroad, who was later confirmed to be a People's Deputy of Ukraine.

On 18 March, member of the Ukrainian parliament Serhii Shakhov stated that he was SARS-CoV-2 positive after denying it earlier in the day. Kyiv Post counted Shakhov as being among the total of 14 people in Ukraine with laboratory confirmations of being SARS-CoV-2 positive.

Later that day, two new cases were announced: the second one for Kyiv Oblast (the wife of the man earlier reported) and the first one for Donetsk Oblast (a 52-year-old man who had visited Egypt).

On 19 March, the third case was confirmed in Kyiv (a person who had travelled from Switzerland), and the second in Zhytomyr Oblast (a 56-year-old man from Zhytomyr who had returned from Austria). The same day, the first cases were reported in Ivano-Frankivsk Oblast and Dnipropetrovsk Oblast, also five new cases were reported in Chernivtsi Oblast, thereby increasing the total number of infected in Ukraine to 26.

On 20 March, the first case of recovery from COVID-19 was reported for a man in Chernivtsi who was the first infected person in the country. On the same day, 15 new positive COVID-19 tests were confirmed across Ukraine: 10 in Chernivtsi Oblast, and one in each of Lviv, Ivano-Frankivsk, Kharkiv, Ternopil, and Kyiv, raising the national total to 41 cases. The case from Kharkiv Oblast was a woman who had been diagnosed in Kyiv, and was being treated in Kyiv, and on 21 March was transferred from the statistics for Kharkiv to those for Kyiv.

On 21 March, according to the Ministry of Health, the total confirmed cases in Ukraine was 47. There were either six or seven new cases confirmed in Kyiv bringing the total to ten (of these eight had caught the disease abroad). In Donetsk Oblast, the first case of coronavirus was recorded and an emergency was declared in the oblast. The first patient was confirmed in Lutsk, and in disputed Crimea. There were 417 people suspected of having coronavirus in Crimea and Sevastopol at the end of 21 March.

As of 10:00 on 23 March, there were 73 confirmed cases in Ukraine. During the previous 24 hours, 26 new cases were confirmed.

As of 10:00 on 24 March 11 new cases had been confirmed in Ukraine during the previous 24 hours, bringing the total to 84 confirmed cases. This was later raised to 97 confirmed cases. The head of the Chernivtsi Oblast state administration, Serhiy Osachuk, said that 13 new cases of the disease had been confirmed in Chernivtsi Oblast. There were 38 infected people in the Ukrainian part of Bukovina.

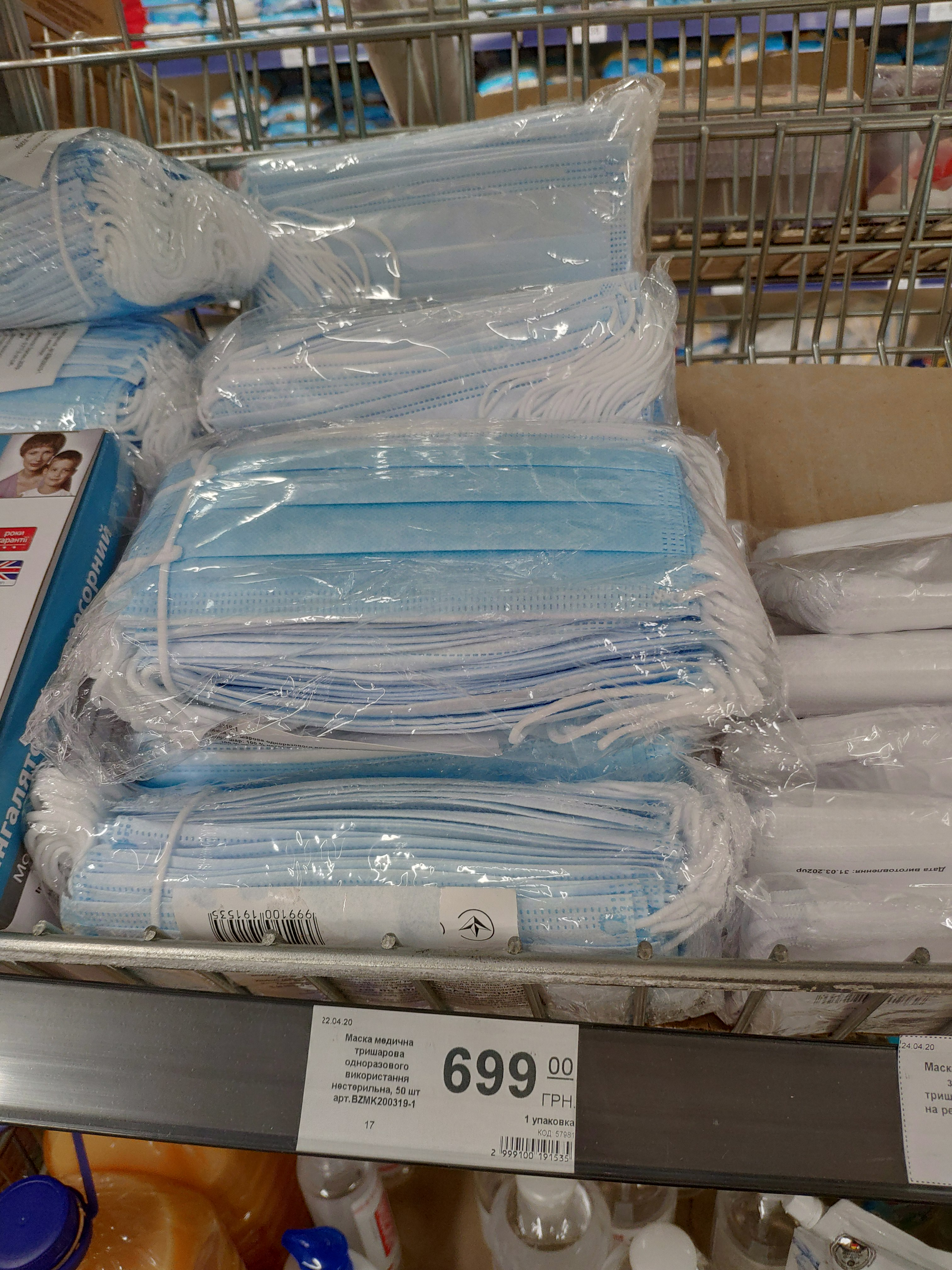
High mask prices is Ukraine during COVID-19. 699 UAH.

At 10:00 on 25 March, the Ministry of Health stated that 29 new cases had been confirmed in Ukraine during the previous 24 hours, bringing the total to 113 confirmed cases. These included the first case in Volyn Oblast, the first two cases in Zaporizhzhia Oblast, two more cases in Kyiv, seven more in Kyiv Oblast, the first case in Luhansk Oblast, the first case in Odesa Oblast, two more cases in Ternopil Oblast, and 13 new cases in Chernivtsi Oblast that had been reported in the media the previous day. One person in the Ternopil Oblast died of the disease.

On 25 March, the Government introduced a 30-day emergency regime across Ukraine that was scheduled planned to end on 24 April.

At 10:00 on 26 March, the Ministry of Health stated that 43 new cases had been confirmed in Ukraine during the previous 24 hours, bringing the total to 156 confirmed cases. One person in Ivano-Frankivsk Oblast died of the disease. By the end of 26 March, there were five confirmed cases in Sevastopol, and nine in the rest of Crimea; over 3,000 people were suspected of having the disease, and nearly 90 were isolated in hospitals in Crimea (including Sevastopol).

At 10:00 on 27 March, the Ministry announced that 62 more cases had been confirmed in Ukraine in the previous 24 hours, bringing the total to 218 confirmed cases. Three more patients from Chernivtsi had recovered from the disease. This brought up to four the number of recovered people: three adults and a child. Repeated laboratory tests showed no trace of the virus, and another Polymerase chain reaction (PCR) test had shown a negative reaction twice in a row.

At 10:00 on 28 March, the Ministry announced that 93 more cases had been confirmed in Ukraine in the previous 24 hours, bringing the total to 311 confirmed cases. Three more people had died, bringing the total to eight. Another person had recovered, bringing the total to five (four adults and one child). There were reported cases in all parts of Ukraine, except Kirovohrad Oblast.

At 10:00 on 29 March, the Ministry announced that 109 new cases had been confirmed, bringing the total to 418. There had been 248 new reports of suspicion of the disease, bringing the total to 1966 since the start of the year. Four cases had been confirmed in Kirovohrad Oblast. The two cases (one per Dnipropetrovsk and Mykolaiv Oblasts) shown in the statistics for 28 March had been moved to the statistics for Kyiv.

=== April 2020 ===
On 6 April, wearing a face mask was required by the government in public places. In Kyiv, public places were clarified to include parks and streets.

On 21 April, it was reported that the Ministry planned to request an extension of the quarantine until 12 May, albeit with some exceptions, such as opening libraries and museums. A day later, the government extended the quarantine measures until 11 May; all measures remained in place, with the exception of granting access to public transport to potential blood donors.

=== May 2020 ===
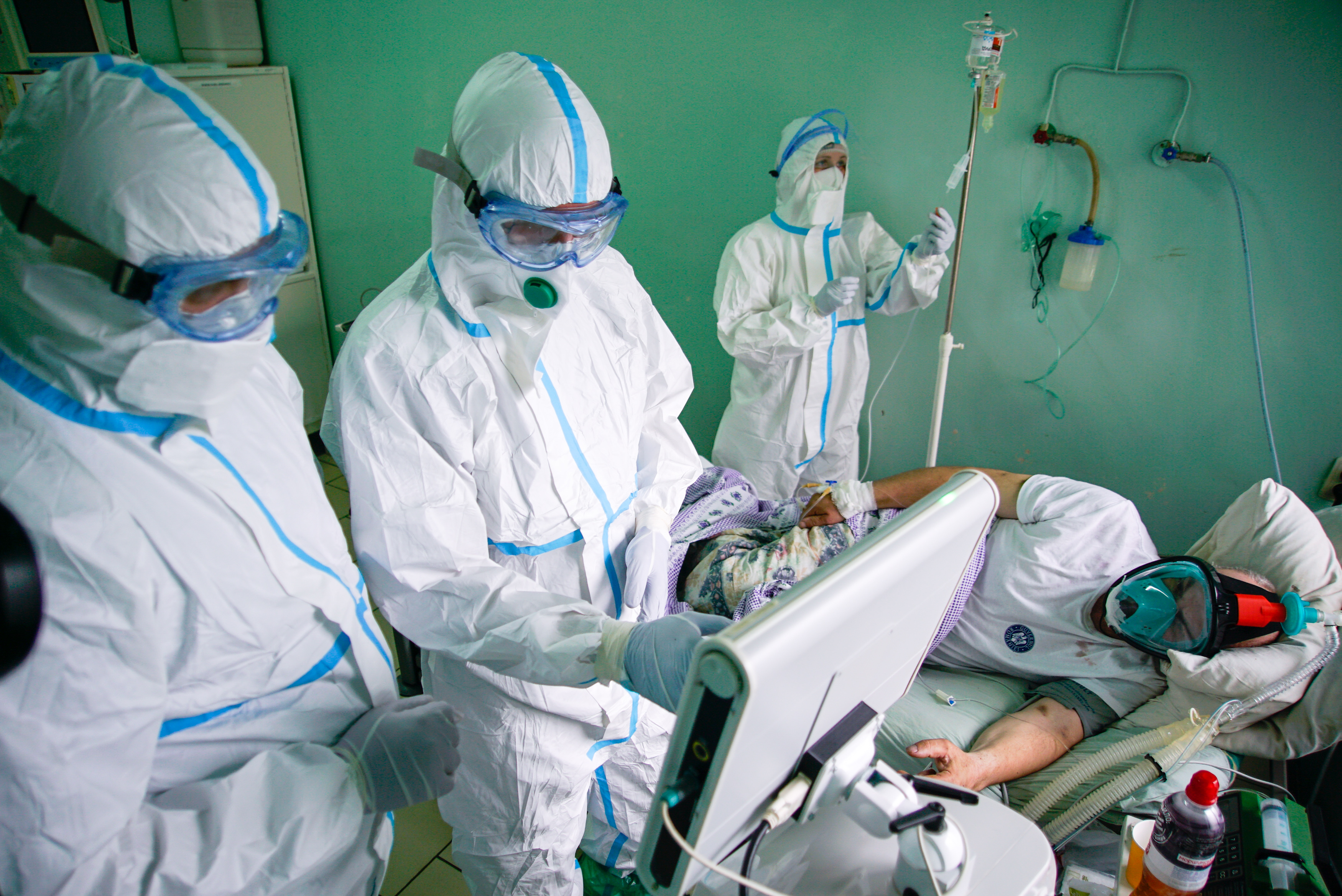
A patient in Ukraine in May 2020 wears a scuba mask in the absence of artificial ventilation

On 4 May, the Ukrainian government extended the quarantine until 22 May.

A number of restrictions were lifted on 11 May. These included the re-opening of parks, squares, recreation areas, beauty salons, hairdressers and barber shops, cafes and restaurants with outdoor tables. The second stage of easing the quarantine is currently scheduled for 22 May, which envisages the reopening of nurseries, public transport, and hotels, and allowing sports competitions to be held.

On 25 May, the metro systems in Kyiv and Kharkiv were reopened.

=== June 2020 ===
On 1 June, railway connections between a number of Ukrainian cities were re-opened.

Domestic flights resumed on 5 June, along with the reopening of restaurants, cafes and religious establishments.

International flights resumed on 15 June, but as of this date, Ukrainians could only travel to Albania, Belarus, the UK, US, and Turkey.

=== July–December 2020 ===
After the government eased restrictions, cases began to surge in August. The government passed some stricter measures, such as closing the country's borders. In mid-September, over 1,000 Orthodox Jewish pilgrims attempting to enter the country from Belarus were blocked from entering Ukraine.

Cases began to rise sharply from July which began to top 10,000 cases a day by November.

On 9 November, Ukraine's president, Volodymr Zelensky announced he had tested positive for COVID-19. He was admitted to hospital three days later. His spokeswoman said that he did this so that he could "accurately isolate and not expose anyone" although he said that there was "nothing serious" about his condition.

On 11 November, the government approved weekend lockdowns were non-essential businesses would close for the weekend for three weeks starting from 14 November.

On 23 December, Ukraine surpassed one million COVID-19 cases.

=== January 2021 ===
On 8 January, Ukraine introduced a new lockdown in an effort to curb high daily infection numbers. Ukraine lifted most of these lockdown restrictions, roughly three weeks later, on 25 January. The lockdown was largely successful, with Ukraine's Health Minister stating "Such statistics, which indicate the stabilisation of the situation, the improvement of the situation could be obtained only thanks to you, Ukrainians."

=== February 2021 ===
An antibody study done by Synevo laboratories showed that in January 2021 already 44% to 60% of all Ukrainians depending on region were infected compared to 33% in October 2020 and 9% in July 2020. The reported numbers of daily new cases and daily deaths had been decreasing since December 2020, but during this month, that trend reversed. Ukraine launched its vaccination campaign on 24 February after a slight delay. 500,000 doses of the AstraZeneca vaccine were received from the Serum Institute of India.

=== October–December 2021 ===
New infections and deaths started to break records by late October 2021. On 25 October Ukrainian health authorities reported a record daily high of 734 coronavirus-related deaths and 19,120 new infections. The recorded previous high of 614 deaths was set three days earlier.

According to data from the Ministry of Health, by mid-December the number of infections was gradually retreating with twice as many recoveries per day as infections. On 11 December 238 coronavirus-related deaths were reported, 5,275 cases of infections were detected and 11.6 thousand people recovered from COVID-19.

=== Russian invasion of Ukraine (February 2022–present) ===
As the Russian invasion of Ukraine broke out, there were concerns that COVID-19 may become a bigger problem moving forward, alongside a polio epidemic. In late May 2022, Chief State Sanitary Doctor Ihor Kuzin stated that since the beginning of the invasion, more than 750 studies had been conducted and that further COVID-19 outbreaks were not expected in Ukraine in the near future.

On 1 July 2023, all emergency measures related to COVID-19 in Ukraine were ended as the Health Ministry downgraded its status from an emergency to a permanent healthcare problem, with the response being the same as other respiratory diseases.

== Vaccination ==
Vactination against COVID-19 in Ukraine started on 24 February 2021, but the tempo of vaccinating has been extremely slow compared to other European countries.

On August 30, 150,482 people were vaccinated against COVID-19: 50,690 people received a single dose, and 99,792 people their second. (The next month) in the week from 6 to 12 September, 921,443 vaccines were inoculated into Ukrainians (on 12September, 16,930 people received one dose and 28,218 people were fully immunized). This making the number of vaccinations given in Ukraine, since 24 February 2021,10,710,944. So 18% of the adult population of Ukraine had been vaccinated against COVID-19 by 13 September 2021. According to the official statistics of 6 September 2021, 7.6% of people over the age of 80 had received at least one dose of the vaccine, for people aged 40–59 this figure was slightly more than 19% and the most vaccinated group was people aged 18–19 years of whom 19.8% had received at least one dose of vaccine. On 14 October 2021 Prime Minister Denys Shmyhal stated that all of the country's adult population should be vaccinated against COVID-19 by the end of the year.

In August 2021 56% of Ukrainians polled by the Ilko Kucheriv Democratic Initiatives Foundation did not plan to be vaccinated. In the same poll 52% opposed mandatory vaccination against COVID-19. The same poll also revealed that 23% of those polled considered vaccination an effective means of protection against COVID-19. The most chosen effective methods of preventing coronavirus disease (according to the August 2021 polled Ukrainians) were "washing your hands after leaving the street" (54%), "keeping distance from others" (42%), "being attentive to their well-being and the health of others" (39%), and "wearing a mask" (36%).

Demand for vaccinations surged after new infections and deaths started to break records by late October 2021. From 15 to 21 October, almost 1 million people were inoculated in Ukraine. On 21 October 16% of Ukraine's population was inoculated. Making Ukraine still one of the least-vaccinated countries in Europe. On 23 October 2021 the Ministry of Health announced that 6.96 million Ukrainians had been fully vaccinated (out of a population of 41 million). An unknown number of Ukrainians had purchased an illegal fake COVID-19 vaccine certificate. (Sold from $20 to $200 with some costing as much as $380.) By 25 October (2021) 800 criminal cases for forged certificates or tests for coronavirus had been opened in Ukraine. Also on 25 October Ukrainian authorities reported a record daily high of 734 coronavirus-related deaths.

On 17 December 2021, the Ministry of Health announced that 46.1% of Ukrainian adults had received at least one shot of a coronavirus vaccine, while 41.3% of the adult population had completed their vaccination. Three days later the ministry stated that since the launch of the inoculation campaign 14,386,387 people had been vaccinated, of whom 14,386,385 received their first dose and 12,986,872 fully immunized (with two jabs).

On 7 January 2022, the Ministry of Health announced that 44.9% of the adult population had undergone a full course of vaccination.

By 18 January 2022, 131,178 Ukrainians had received a booster dose. Following the Russian invasion of Ukraine, the Ukrainian vaccination program continued, although on a much smaller scale with 50–60 thousand people being vaccinated in a week by late May 2022. Vaccination continued in all regions of Ukraine, except in Luhansk and Donetsk Oblast.

On 19 September 2022 the Ministry of Health announced the offer a third dose of the vaccine to everyone four months after their previous injection.

== Cases by region ==

The following information was reported as of 9:00 am on 27 July 2021:

Region	Cases	Deaths	Recovered	Active
Vinnytsia Oblast	71394	1699	69506	189
Volyn Oblast	62274	1204	61020	50
Dnipropetrovsk Oblast	136319	4499	131284	536
Donetsk Oblast	91389	2388	88520	481
Zhytomyr Oblast	88748	1803	86713	232
Zakarpattia Oblast	62209	1608	60508	93
Zaporizhzhia Oblast	105084	2451	102323	310
Ivano-Frankivsk Oblast	86825	2107	84615	103
Kyiv Oblast	128075	2767	124841	467
Kirovohrad Oblast	20706	856	19739	111
Luhansk Oblast	27041	971	25719	351
Lviv Oblast	138014	3681	133809	524
Mykolaiv Oblast	70323	1865	68252	206
Odesa Oblast	141693	3008	137788	897
Poltava Oblast	78226	1872	76112	242
Rivne Oblast	79657	1207	78383	67
Sumy Oblast	78362	1343	76713	306
Ternopil Oblast	70167	1204	68898	65
Kharkiv Oblast	149212	3594	144954	664
Kherson Oblast	36272	1162	34726	384
Khmelnytskyi Oblast	89171	1890	87114	167
Cherkasy Oblast	82141	1321	80431	389
Chernivtsi Oblast	80114	1796	78193	125
Chernihiv Oblast	57727	1352	55996	379
Kyiv	218201	5228	208723	4250
Total	2249344	52876	2184880	11588

Data from the occupied territories of Donetsk and Luhansk Oblasts, the Autonomous Republic of Crimea, and the city of Sevastopol is excluded from the daily updates by the Ukrainian Ministry of Healthcare. The unrecognized Donetsk People's Republic and the unrecognized Luhansk People's Republic report numbers independently, while Russia includes the annexed Republic of Crimea in its numbers.

== Statistics ==
In August 2021 the Ministry of Health reported that 80% of all Ukrainian deaths from COVID-19 had been people over 60. The report stated that, as of 14 August 2021, 53,255 Ukrainians had died of COVID-19, of which 43,566 were aged 60+. The share of people aged 60–69 among the dead was 29% (15,533 people), and for people older than 70 this percentage was 52% (28,033).

=== New COVID-19 cases reported in Ukraine ===
New COVID-19 cases reported in Ukraine

March 2020
Report as of		Confirmed		Deaths		Recovered		Active current	Tests^{(3)}		Suspected^{(3)}		Ref	Ratios	
Date	Time	New^{(0)}	Total	New	Total	New	Total	Active current	New	Total	New	Total	Ref	Death rate, %^{(1)}	Positive test rate, %^{(2)}
2020-03-21	21:00	26	47	-	3	-	-	44			-	531		6.38	22.8
2020-03-22	21:00	11	73	-	3	-	0	70			114	645		4.11	9.9
2020-03-24	10:00	29	84	-	3	1	1	80			111	756		3.57	15.7
2020-03-25	10:00	43	113	2	3	-	1	109			185	941		2.65	23.5
2020-03-25	22:00	43	145	2	5	-	1	139			183	1,124		3.45	23.5
2020-03-26	10:00	62	156	-	5	-	1	150			-	1,124		3.21	22.4
2020-03-26	22:00	62	196	-	5	-	1	190			277	1,401		2.55	22.4
2020-03-27	10:00	93	218	3	5	4	5	208			-	1,401		2.29	30.0
2020-03-28	10:00	107	311	1	8	-	5	298			310	1,712		2.57	42.1
2020-03-28	22:00	107	356	1	9	-	5	342			254	1966		2.53	42.1
2020-03-29	10:00	62	418	2	9	-	5	404			-	1,966		2.15	20.8
2020-03-29	22:00	62	475	2	10	1	6	459			298	2,264		2.11	20.8
2020-03-30	10:00	69	480	2	11	2	6	463			-	2,264		2.29	18.3
2020-03-30	22:00	69	548	2	13	2	8	527			378	2,642		2.37	18.3
2020-03-31	10:00	120	549	4	13	2	8	528			-	2,642		2.37	22.4
2020-03-31	22:00	120	645	4	17	2	10	618			536	3,178		2.63	22.4

April 2020
Report as of		Confirmed		Deaths		Recovered		Active current	Tests^{(3)}		Suspected^{(3)}		Ref	Ratios	
Date	Time	New^{(0)}	Total	New	Total	New	Total	Active current	New	Total	New	Total	Ref	Death rate, %^{(1)}	Positive test rate, %^{(2)}
2020-04-01	10:00	135	669	3	17	3	10	642			656	3,178		2.63	20.58
2020-04-02	10:00	138	804	3	20	6	13	781			570	3,834		2.49	24.21
2020-04-03	10:00	154	942	5	23	4	19	900			636	4,404		2.44	24.21
2020-04-04	10:00	155	1,096	4	28	2	23	1,045			453	5,040		2.55	34.22
2020-04-05	10:00	68	1,251	6	32	3	25	1,194			371	5,493		2.56	18.33
2020-04-06	09:00	143	1,319	7	38	0	28	1,253			521	5,864		2.88	27.45
2020-04-07	09:00	206	1,462	7	45	7	28	1,389	1,409	16.803	820	6,385		3.08	25.12
2020-04-08	09:00	224	1,668	5	52	10	35	1,581	1,945	18,212	696	7,205		3.12	32.18
2020-04-09	09:00	311	1,892	12	57	16	45	1,790	2,396	20,608	862	7,901		3.01	36.08
2020-04-10	09:00	308	2,203	4	69	18	61	2,073	2,914	23,522	1,012	8,763		3.13	30.43
2020-04-11	09:00	266	2,511	10	73	10	79	2,359	3,055	26,577	657	9,775		2.91	40.49
2020-04-12	09:00	325	2,777	10	83	8	89	2,605	3,737	30,314	704	10,432		2.99	46.16
2020-04-13	09:00	270	3,102	5	93	22	97	2,912	2,182	32,496	838	11,136		3.00	32.22
2020-04-14	09:00	392	3,372	10	98	24	119	3,155	2,657	35,153	1,213	11,974		2.91	32.32
2020-04-15	09:00	397	3,764	8	108	43	143	3,513	3,931	39,084	1,124	13,187		2.87	35.32
2020-04-16	09:00	501	4,161	9	116	60	186	3,859	3,739	42,823	1,137	14,311		2.79	44.06
2020-04-17	09:00	444	4,662	8	125	29	246	4,291	4,273	47,096	1,189	15,448		2.68	37.34
2020-04-18	09:00	343	5,106	8	133	72	275	4,698	5,438	52,534	731	16,637		2.60	46.92
2020-04-19	09:00	261	5,449	10	141	12	347	4,961	4,577	57,111	454	17,368		2.59	57.49
2020-04-20	09:00	415	5,710	10	151	8	359	5,200	982	58,093	710	17,822		2.64	58.45
2020-04-21	09:00	467	6,125	13	161	57	367	5,597	3,904	61,997	1,117	17,822		2.63	41.81
2020-04-22	09:00	578	6,592	13	174	80	424	5,994	5,523	67,520	1,409	19,649		2.64	41.02
2020-04-23	09:00	477	7,170	6	187	97	504	6,479	4,776	72,296	1,460	21,058		2.61	32.67
2020-04-24	09:00	478	7,647	8	193	181	601	6,853	5,456	77,752	1,451	22,518		2.52	32.94
2020-04-25	09:00	492	8,125	8	201	58	782	7,142	5,825	83,577	873	23,969		2.47	56.36
2020-04-26	09:00	392	8,617	11	209	24	840	7,568	5,796	89,373	647	24,842		2.43	60.59
2020-04-27	09:00	401	9,009	19	220	128	864	7,925	4,146	93,519	1,127	25,489		2.44	35.58
2020-04-28	09:00	456	9,410	11	239	111	992	8,179	5,200	98,719	1,230	26,616		2.54	37.07
2020-04-29	09:00	540	9,866	11	250	135	1,103	8,513	5,825	104,544	1,216	27,846		2.53	44.41
2020-04-30	09:00	455	10,406	11	261	175	1,238	8,907	7,315	111,859	1,254	29,062		2.51	36.28

May 2020
Report as of		Confirmed		Deaths		Recovered		Active current	Tests^{(3)}		Suspected^{(3)}		Ref	Ratios	
Date	Time	New^{(0)}	Total	New	Total	New	Total	Active current	New	Total	New	Total	Ref	Death rate, %^{(1)}	Positive test rate, %^{(2)}
2020-05-01	09:00	550	10,861	7	272	85	1,413	9,176	6,686	118,545	727	30,316		2.50	75.65
2020-05-02	09:00	502	11,411	9	279	50	1,498	9,634	4,207	122,752	681	31,043		2.45	73.72
2020-05-03	09:00	418	11,913	15	288	71	1,548	10,077	6,971	129,723	546	31,724		2.42	76.56
2020-05-04	09:00	366	12,331	13	303	256	1,619	10,409	4,869	134,592	1,041	32,270		2.46	35.16
2020-05-05	09:00	487	12,697	11	316	222	1,875	10,506	5,167	139,759	1,411	33,311		2.49	34.51
2020-05-06	09:00	507	13,184	13	327	299	2,097	10,760	4,524	144,283	1,182	34,722		2.48	42.89
2020-05-07	09:00	504	13,691	21	340	310	2,396	10,955	7,286	151,569	1,148	35,904		2.48	43.90
2020-05-08	09:00	515	14,195	15	361	203	2,706	11,128	7,586	159,155	1,127	37,052		2.54	45.70
2020-05-09	09:00	522	14,710	15	376	151	2,909	11,425	7,952	167,107	1,084	38,179		2.56	48.15
2020-05-10	09:00	416	15,232	17	391	228	3,060	11,781	9,296	176,403	529	39,263		2.57	78.64
2020-05-11	09:00	375	15,648	17	408	85	3,288	11,952	5,149	181,552	497	39,792		2.61	75.45
2020-05-12	09:00	402	16,023	14	425	343	3,373	12,225	5,755	187,307	1,038	40,289		2.65	38.73
2020-05-13	09:00	422	16,425	17	439	427	3,716	12,270	4,940	192,247	1,263	41,327		2.67	33.41
2020-05-14	09:00	483	16,847	20	456	330	4,143	12,248	10,248	202,495	1,252	42,590		2.71	38.58
2020-05-15	09:00	528	17,330	21	476	433	4,473	12,381	9,119	211,614	1,196	43,842		2.75	44.15
2020-05-16	09:00	433	17,858	17	497	210	4,906	12,455	9,024	220,638	631	45,038		2.78	68.62
2020-05-17	09:00	325	18,291	21	514	160	5,116	12,661	7,163	227,801	560	45,669		2.81	58.04
2020-05-18	09:00	260	18,616	13	535	356	5,276	12,805	5,098	232,899	945	46,229		2.87	27.51
2020-05-19	09:00	354	18,876	16	548	323	5,632	12,696	7,062	239,961	1,154	47,174		2.90	30.68
2020-05-20	09:00	476	19,230	15	564	272	5,955	12,711	8,568	248,529	1,024	48,328		2.93	46.48
2020-05-21	09:00	442	19,706	9	579	358	6,227	12,900	9,361	257,890	1,284	49,352		2.94	34.42
2020-05-22	09:00	432	20,148	17	588	344	6,585	12,975	9,295	267,185	1,050	50,636		2.92	41.14
2020-05-23	09:00	406	20,580	12	605	179	6,929	13,046	10,527	277,712	848	51,686		2.94	47.88
2020-05-24	09:00	259	20,986	6	617	126	7,108	13,261	7,914	285,626	477	52,534		2.94	54.30
2020-05-25	09:00	339	21,245	21	623	341	7,234	13,388	6,242	291,868	950	53,011		2.93	35.68
2020-05-26	09:00	321	21,584	14	644	420	7,575	13,365	9,868	301,736	924	53,961		2.98	34.74
2020-05-27	09:00	477	21,905	11	658	444	7,995	13,252	10,796	312,532	1,110	54,885		3.00	42.97
2020-05-28	09:00	429	22,382	10	669	495	8,439	13,274	10,214	322,746	1,011	55,995		2.99	42.43
2020-05-29	09:00	393	22,811	17	679	377	8,934	13,198	14,572	337,318	929	57,006		2.98	42.30
2020-05-30	09:00	468	23,204	12	696	227	9,311	13,197	10,961	348,279	908	57,935		3.00	51.54
2020-05-31	09:00	340	23,672	10	708	152	9,538	13,426	8,286	356,565	496	58,843		2.99	68.55

June 2020
Report as of		Confirmed		Deaths		Recovered		Active current	Tests^{(3)}		Suspected^{(3)}		Ref	Ratios	
Date	Time	New^{(0)}	Total	New	Total	New	Total	Active current	New	Total	New	Total	Ref	Death rate, %^{(1)}	Positive test rate, %^{(2)}
2020-06-01	09:00	328	24,012	9	718	388	9,690	13,604	6,622	363,187	749	59,339		2.99	43.79
2020-06-02	09:00	483	24,340	8	727	362	10,078	13,535	8,481	371,668	-	60,088		2.99	-
2020-06-03	09:00	588	24,823	12	735	602	10,440	13,648	9,884	381,552	-	-		2.96	-
2020-06-04	09:00	553	25,411	15	747	330	11,042	13,622	10,764	392,316	-	-		2.94	-
2020-06-05	09:00	550	25,964	15	762	440	11,372	13,830	11,235	403,551	-	-		2.93	-
2020-06-06	09:00	485	26,514	11	777	242	11,812	13,925	10,991	414,542	-	-		2.93	-
2020-06-07	09:00	463	26,999	9	788	141	12,054	14,157	9,504	424,046	-	-		2.92	-
2020-06-08	09:00	394	27,462	13	797	217	12,195	14,470	7,039	431,085	-	-		2.90	-
2020-06-09	09:00	525	27,856	23	810	357	12,412	14,634	6,359	437,444	-	-		2.91	-
2020-06-10	09:00	689	28,381	21	833	372	12,769	14,779	8,496	445,940	1,139	67,138		2.94	60.49
2020-06-11	09:00	683	29,070	16	854	323	13,141	15,075	10,569	456,509	1,244	68,277		2.94	54.90
2020-06-12	09:00	753	29,753	10	870	512	13,464	15,419	11,663	468,172	991	69,521		2.92	75.98
2020-06-13	09:00	648	30,506	9	880	106	13,976	15,650	10,939	479,111	864	70,512		2.88	75.00
2020-06-14	09:00	656	31,154	12	889	171	14,082	16,183	10,223	489,334	753	71,376		2.85	87.12
2020-06-15	09:00	666	31,810	11	901	275	14,253	16,656	7,950	497,284	1,388	72,129		2.83	47.98
2020-06-16	09:00	758	32,476	31	912	415	14,528	17,036	9,967	507,251	1,136	73,517		2.81	66.73
2020-06-17	09:00	829	33,234	23	943	504	14,943	17,348	10,744	517,995	-	74,653		2.84	-
2020-06-18	09:00	921	34,063	19	966	586	15,447	17,650	12,447	530,442	-	-		2.84	-
2020-06-19	09:00	841	34,984	9	985	373	16,033	17,966	11,805	542,247	-	-		2.82	-
2020-06-20	09:00	735	35,825	8	994	103	16,406	18,425	11,490	553,737	881	78,194		2.77	83.43
2020-06-21	09:00	681	36,560	10	1,002	133	16,509	19,049	9,457	563,194	772	79,075		2.74	88.21
2020-06-22	09:00	833	37,241	23	1,012	314	16,642	19,587	6,395	569,589	1,278	79,847		2.72	65.18
2020-06-23	09:00	940	38,074	16	1,035	453	16,956	20,083	11,225	580,814	-	81,125		2.72	-
2020-06-24	09:00	994	39,014	16	1,051	349	17,409	20,554	13,188	594,002	-	-		2.69	-
2020-06-25	09:00	1,109	40,008	19	1,067	541	17,758	21,183	12,764	606,766	-	-		2.67	-
2020-06-26	09:00	948	41,117	24	1,086	402	18,299	21,732	13,858	620,624	-	-		2.64	-
2020-06-27	09:00	917	42,065	19	1,110	233	18,701	22,254	11,342	631,966	-	-		2.64	-
2020-06-28	09:00	646	42,982	18	1,129	93	18,934	22,919	9,945	641,911	-	-		2.63	-
2020-06-29	09:00	706	43,628	12	1,147	88	19,027	23,454	7,239	649,150	-	-		2.63	-
2020-06-30	09:00	664	44,334	14	1,159	433	19,115	24,060	6,972	656,122	-	-		2.61	-

July 2020
Report as of		Confirmed		Deaths		Recovered		Active current	Tests^{(3)}		Suspected^{(3)}		Ref	Ratios	
Date	Time	New^{(0)}	Total	New	Total	New	Total	Active current	New	Total	New	Total	Ref	Death rate, %^{(1)}	Positive test rate, %^{(2)}
2020-07-01	09:00	889	44,998	12	1,173	505	19,548	24,277	10,025	666,147	-	-		2.61	-
2020-07-02	09:00	876	45,887	27	1,185	505	20,053	24,649	11,110	677,257	-	-		2.58	-
2020-07-03	09:00	914	46,763	15	1,212	597	20,558	24,993	13,696	690,953	-	-		2.59	-
2020-07-04	09:00	823	47,677	22	1,227	221	21,155	25,295	14,883	705,836	-	-		2.57	-
2020-07-05	09:00	543	48,500	13	1,249	327	21,376	25,875	9,934	715,770	-	-		2.58	-
2020-07-06	09:00	564	49,043	21	1,262	490	21,703	26,078	6,743	722,513	-	-		2.57	-
2020-07-07	09:00	807	49,607	23	1,283	926	22,193	26,131	9,345	731,858	-	-		2.59	-
2020-07-08	09:00	810	50,414	21	1,306	665	23,119	25,989	13,455	745,313	-	-		2.59	-
2020-07-09	09:00	819	51,224	18	1,327	1,016	23,784	26,113	14,934	760,247	-	-		2.59	-
2020-07-10	09:00	800	52,043	27	1,345	861	24,800	25,898	13,584	773,831	-	-		2.58	-
2020-07-11	09:00	678	52,843	11	1,372	457	25,661	25,810	12,571	786,402	-	-		2.60	-
2020-07-12	09:00	612	53,521	15	1,383	385	26,118	26,020	10,278	796,680	-	-		2.58	-
2020-07-13	09:00	638	54,133	14	1,398	651	26,503	26,232	6,977	803,657	-	-		2.58	-
2020-07-14	09:00	836	54,771	15	1,412	977	27,154	26,205	9,739	813,396	-	-		2.58	-
2020-07-15	09:00	848	55,607	18	1,427	800	28,131	26,049	13,761	827,157	-	-		2.57	-
2020-07-16	09:00	809	56,455	11	1,445	838	28,931	26,079	13,175	840,332	-	-		2.56	-
2020-07-17	09:00	847	57,264	21	1,456	756	29,769	26,039	13,732	854,064	-	-		2.54	-
2020-07-18	09:00	731	58,111	8	1,477	354	30,525	26,109	10,532	864,596	-	-		2.54	-
2020-07-19	09:00	651	58,842	13	1,485	560	30,879	26,478	12,666	877,262	703	108,207		2.52	92.60
2020-07-20	09:00	673	59,493	20	1,498	760	31,439	26,556	4,645	881,907	1,044	108,910		2.52	64.46
2020-07-21	09:00	829	60,166	16	1,518	973	32,199	26,449	12,486	894,393	1,160	109,954		2.52	71.47
2020-07-22	09:00	856	60,995	17	1,534	828	33,172	26,289	12,967	907,360	1,141	111,114		2.51	75.02
2020-07-23	09:00	-	61,851	-	1,551	-	34,000	26,300	14,498	921,858	-	112,255		2.51	-
Notes^{(0)} New confirmed cases are calculated on a per day basis for convenience and listed as the previous day, e.g. data for 30 March (5 cases) and 29 March ( 57 cases) was reported as 62 cases for 29 March. ^{(1)} The death rate is defined as the ratio of total current deaths to the total current confirmed cases. ^{(2)} The positive test rate is defined as the ratio of new confirmed test cases to the number of new tests corresponding to the last day. ^{(3)} Ukraine defines testing unit on a 'suspected case' basis: it is a person with COVID-19 symptoms or a person that contacted such suspected person. A single person can be tested several times (an average value is 2.5) during the course of treatment to ensure treatment is successful.

== Three different quarantine zones ==
The Cabinet of Ministers of Ukraine has set four different levels of epidemic danger:

- the "green" zone; where there is a requirement for the mandatory wearing of masks in public buildings and transport
- the "yellow" zone; where (in addition to the mask mode and the need to maintain a distance) mass events with the participation of more than one person per four square meters of the area of the premises or territory is prohibited, the congestion of cinemas and other cultural institutions by more than 50% of seats is prohibited, the congestion of gyms and fitness centers with more than one person by 10 square meters is prohibited and the work of educational institutions will be closed, except for those where at least 80% of employees have a "yellow" or "green" COVID certificate
- the "red" epidemiological zone; where it will be prohibited to supply public catering (except for targeted delivery and take-out orders) and shopping and entertainment centers, cinemas, theaters, entertainment establishments, cultural institutions (except for historical and cultural reserves) film and video filming, non-food markets and shops, gyms, swimming pools and fitness centers, educational institutions, mass events (except for official sports events and matches of team playing sports without spectators), hotels, hostels, etc. will be closed;

These restrictions will not apply if all staff and all visitors, except those under 18, are fully vaccinated against COVID-19.

On 9 June 2021 all Ukrainian regions were set in a 'green' quarantine zone.

On 23 September 2021 all of Ukraine was set to the "yellow" zone.

On 15 October Kherson Oblast was classified as a "red" zone and on 18 October Zaporizhzhia Oblast, Odesa Oblast, Donetsk Oblast and Dnipropetrovsk Oblast were also made a "red" zone. On 23 October Sumy Oblast and on 26 October Rivne Oblast and Mykolaiv Oblast joined them. On 30 October 2021 Zhytomyr Oblast, Ivano-Frankivsk Oblast, Kyiv Oblast, Luhansk Oblast, Lviv Oblast, Khmelnytskyi Oblast and Chernihiv Oblast also become "red" zones. (The city of) Kyiv was placed in the "red" zone on 1 November 2021.

On 28 November 2021 only Zakarpattia Oblast, Kirovohrad Oblast, Ternopil Oblast, Kharkiv Oblast and Chernivtsi Oblast were in the yellow zone, Poltava Oblast was in the orange zone, and the rest of the regions had been placed in the red zone.

On 23 December 2021 only Zaporizhzhia Oblast and Volyn Oblast remained in the red zone and all other were a yellow zone. 7 days later Zaporizhzhia Oblast and Volyn Oblast also became a yellow zone.

On 29 January 2022, there were two regions (Ivano-Frankivsk Oblast and Rivne Oblast) a red zone, 16 regions (Vinnytsia Oblast, Volyn Oblast, Donetsk Oblast, Zhytomyr Oblast, Zakarpattia Oblast, Zaporizhia Oblast, Luhansk Oblast, Lviv Oblast, Mykolaiv Oblast, Odesa Oblast, Sumy Oblast, Ternopil Oblast, Khmelnytsky Oblast, Cherkasy Oblast, Chernivtsi Oblast and Chernihiv Oblast) were an orange zone and only (the city of) Kyiv, as well as Dnipropetrovsk Oblast, Kyiv Oblast, Kirovohrad Oblast, Poltava Oblast, Kharkiv Oblast and Kherson Oblast regions remained "yellow".

== See also ==
- COVID-19 pandemic death rates by country
- COVID-19 pandemic in Europe
- COVID-19 pandemic by country and territory
