= COVID-19 vaccination in Moldova =

Vaccination campaign against the COVID-19 pandemic in Moldova

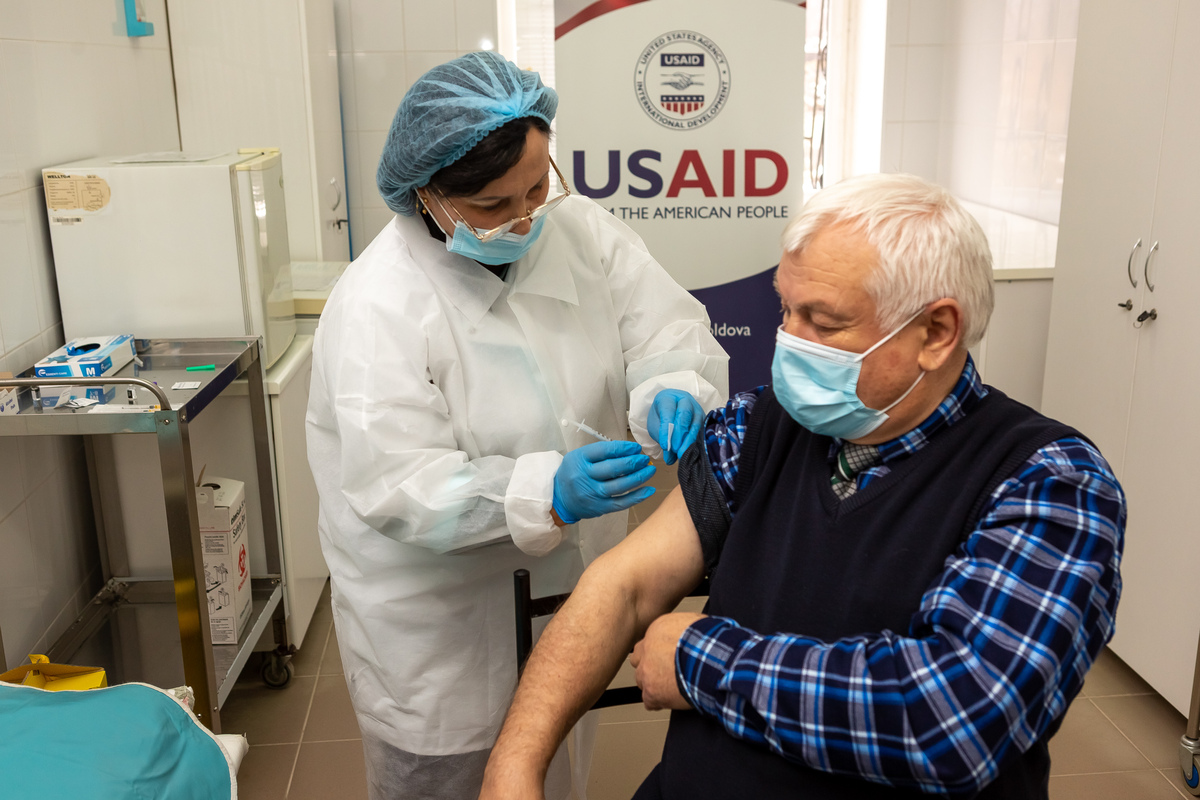
- A Moldovan citizen receiving a Pfizer–BioNTech COVID-19 vaccine donated by the United States through the COVAX initiative in 2022
- Date: 2 March 2021 − ongoing
- Location: Nationwide
- Cause: COVID-19 pandemic in Moldova
- Organised by: Government of Moldova
- Participants: 1,076,909 people, including in Transnistria, vaccinated with at least one dose (22 February 2022) 31%
- Website: vaccinare.gov.md

COVID-19 vaccination in Moldova started on 2 March 2021. During the COVID-19 pandemic, Moldova was very reliant on external help from other countries, having received donations of vaccines from Romania, the United Arab Emirates, Russia and China. In fact, Moldova's vaccination campaign started due to a donation from Romania on 27 February 2021 composed of 21,600 Oxford–AstraZeneca COVID-19 vaccine doses, with the first vaccinated person in the country being Alexandru Botizatu. Romania had promised earlier, on 29 December 2020, that it would help Moldova with a collaboration project which would include 200,000 vaccine doses to help Moldova combat the pandemic, but also other matters of the country. Romania subsequently made more donations on 27 March 2021 with 50,400 vaccine units; on 17 April 2021 with 132,000 vaccine doses, fulfilling its promise to Moldova; and on 7 May 2021 with 100,800 vaccine units even though this surpassed the promised 200,000 vaccine doses.

However, Moldova also received help from other countries and organizations. On 5 March 2021, the country received 14,400 vaccine doses through COVAX, an international program with the aim of helping poor countries that could not afford many vaccines at the time. Moldova later received 2,000 vaccine units from the United Arab Emirates on 13 March 2021; 71,000 vaccine doses twice on 24 April 2021 and on 30 April 2021 from Russia, a country that promised Moldova a total of 182,000 vaccine units; and 150,000 vaccine doses on 27 April 2021 from China. Moldova also bought other 100,000 of them from the same country, which were also received on 27 April 2021, and has negotiated with several vaccine producers to be able to provide help to its population. Additionally, the World Bank approved funds for helping Moldova with its vaccination programme. The unrecognized state of Transnistria, part of Moldova by international law, has also benefited from donations made to Moldova, having received vaccine units from both Romania and Russia.

== History ==
=== March ===
The first vaccines administered in Moldova, belonging to the Oxford–AstraZeneca COVID-19 vaccine, came from a donation of 21,600 of them made on 27 February 2021 from Romania. The country had announced during a visit on 29 December 2020 by the Romanian President Klaus Iohannis with the Moldovan President Maia Sandu in Chișinău, the Moldovan capital, that it would give a total of 200,000 vaccine units to Moldova as part of a collaboration project on matters of the COVID-19 pandemic and other topics between both countries.

On the day the Romanian vaccines were received, some 750 Moldovan doctors in COVID-19 hospitals were given it. The first person in the country to receive a vaccine was Alexandru Botizatu, a member of the medical staff of the Timofei Moșneaga Republican Clinical Hospital at Chișinău, at 10:00 am. Some 240 doses were to be used in the autonomous region of Gagauzia, but this traditionally pro-Russian region rejected the vaccines, declaring that it preferred to use the Pfizer–BioNTech or the Sputnik V COVID-19 vaccines, the latter being from Russia and without authorization for its use in Moldova. This act was severely criticized by Moldovan health experts.

On 5 March 2021, Moldova received 14,400 Oxford–AstraZeneca vaccine doses through the COVAX program, which aims to equip poor countries with COVID-19 vaccine units. Moldova was the first country in Europe to receive vaccine doses through COVAX. Through this process, Moldova has already secured vaccine units for some 1.7 million people, roughly half of its population. Some of these are supposed to arrive in the second half of March, belonging to the Pfizer–BioNTech COVID-19 vaccine. Moldova also donated 1,810 vaccines from the Romanian donation to the authorities of the unrecognized state of Transnistria (internationally recognized as part of Moldova) to help them in the country's vaccination process on the same day. Initially, the Transnistrian President Vadim Krasnoselsky said that the vaccines donated by Moldova "were from the humanitarian aid along the lines of the WHO (World Health Organization)" and not from Romania. However, Krasnoselsky later rectified and said that the vaccines came from Romania, thanking the Romanian state for the help.

On 13 March 2021, after a call for help to the Minister of Foreign Affairs and International Cooperation of the United Arab Emirates (UAE) Abdullah bin Zayed Al Nahyan by the interim Prime Minister of Moldova Aureliu Ciocoi, it was announced that the UAE had donated 2,000 units of Sinopharm's COVID-19 vaccine to Moldova. Later, on 27 March 2021, Romania sent a new batch composed of 50,400 vaccine units to Moldova. The Prime Minister of Romania, Florin Cîțu, reconfirmed Romania's intentions to fulfill its promise to send Moldova 200,000 vaccine doses in total.

=== April ===
On 7 April 2021, the Ministry of Health, Labour and Social Protection of Moldova was informed of Russia's intention of donating 182,000 Sputnik V COVID-19 vaccine doses to Moldova, of which 62,000 would go to Transnistria. Two days later, on 9 April 2021, the same ministry announced negotiations were being made with a Chinese company, the only one that answered to offers of the ministry for buying vaccines, to acquire 400,000 units of the CoronaVac COVID-19 vaccine. Furthermore, on 17 April 2021, Romania sent another 132,000 vaccine units to Moldova, fulfilling the promise made to the country. This was the largest out of all these vaccine donations made by Romania to Moldova to date. On 22 April 2021, Li Zhanshu, the Chairman of the Standing Committee of the National People's Congress, sent a letter to the President of the Moldovan Parliament Zinaida Greceanîi announcing China's intention to donate 150,000 COVID-19 vaccine units to Moldova, something which had been rumoured to happen since 16 April 2021.

On 24 April 2021, the first batch of Russian vaccines arrived to Moldova. Some of them would be given to Gagauzia, which had declared it rejected all vaccines other than Pfizer–BioNTech and Sputnik V for use in the region. The former President of Moldova Igor Dodon said that 142,000 vaccine doses had been given. However, it was announced they were only 71,000, and Dodon was accused with intentionally inflating the amount of vaccines received by Moldova from Russia. Russia also delivered 31,000 of the 71,000 vaccine doses to Transnistria directly, without giving them first to the Moldovan authorities as had been made previously with Romania's and the COVAX programme's donations to the country. Russia was also accused with having gifted Moldova rejected vaccines that were supposed to be given to Slovakia. Later, China's promised Sinopharm vaccine doses, together with other bought 100,000 doses of the same vaccine, arrived on 27 April 2021 to Moldova. There was a donation ceremony between Greceanîi, the State Secretary of the Ministry of Health, Labour and Social Protection of Moldova Igor Curov and the Chinese ambassador to Moldova Zhang Yinghong in which the good relationship between China and Moldova was reaffirmed. On the same day, the World Bank approved a total of 24.8 million euros in funds to help Moldova acquire more vaccine units and deploy them to up to 50% of its citizens. On 30 April 2021, a second batch of 71,000 Sputnik V COVID-19 vaccine doses from Russia arrived to Moldova and a donation ceremony with the participation of Greceanîi and Dodon was made. The latter said that another 40,000 doses from Russia would come in the following weeks and that he would get vaccinated with the Russian vaccine.

=== May ===
Vaccination with Sputnik V officially started in Moldova on 4 May 2021. A day later, on 5 May 2021, Curov said negotiations were being conducted with the producers of the Pfizer–BioNTech COVID-19 vaccine to buy some 700,000 vaccine units from them. He also said that offers to other vaccine producers had been made and that another donation from the COVAX program was expected to arrive in May. On the same day, the aforementioned ministry said Moldova had received 684,970 COVID-19 vaccine units, of which 151,145 had been used by then.

On 7 May 2021, Romania decided to continue helping Moldova by sending to the country once again 100,800 Oxford–AstraZeneca vaccine units, promising that more would follow some time after. They arrived on 8 May 2021 via the European Union's Directorate-General for European Civil Protection and Humanitarian Aid Operations. Sandu had previously said she would only get vaccinated when it was sure there would be enough vaccines for the Moldovan population, which she did after hearing this novelty from Romania. She also encouraged other citizens who had not yet gotten vaccinated to do so and said that Romania would offer to sell up to 200,000 vaccines a month to Moldova, something confirmed by Cîțu. Additionally, he also said Romania was preparing to donate some 100,000 vaccines to Ukraine.

=== June ===
On 11 June 2021, Romania donated 100,800 vaccine doses produced by AstraZeneca.

== Progress ==
As of 17 March 2021, at 16:30 EET, 17,578 had been vaccinated in Moldova. Time later, on 26 March 2021, at 17:30 EET, 33,885 people had been vaccinated. On 23 April 2021, the milestone of 100,000 vaccinated people was achieved.

== See also ==
- Deployment of COVID-19 vaccines
- COVID-19 pandemic in Moldova
- COVID-19 vaccination in Romania
