= COVID-19 pandemic in the Luhansk People's Republic =

Ongoing COVID-19 viral pandemic in the Luhansk People's Republic

- Disease: COVID-19
- Pathogen: SARS-CoV-2
- Location: Luhansk People's Republic
- Arrival date: 30 March 2020 (6 years, 1 month, 2 weeks and 4 days)

The COVID-19 pandemic was confirmed to have reached the Luhansk People's Republic (LPR), a disputed Russian republic in eastern Ukraine, (Note: The Luhansk People's Republic (LPR) was established by Russian-backed separatists in the Luhansk Oblast of eastern Ukraine in 2014, during the war in Donbas. The disputed entity was annexed by Russia in 2022, during the 2022 Russian invasion of Ukraine. Russia regards the LPR as a Russian republic, a claim that is unrecognised by Ukraine and by most of the international community.) in March 2020. For the rest of Ukraine, see COVID-19 pandemic in Ukraine.

== Background ==
On 12 January 2020, the World Health Organization (WHO) confirmed that a novel coronavirus was the cause of a respiratory illness in a cluster of people in Wuhan City, Hubei Province, China, which was reported to the WHO on 31 December 2019.

The case fatality ratio for COVID-19 has been much lower than SARS of 2003, but the transmission has been significantly greater, with a significant total death toll.

== Timeline ==
=== April 2020 ===
In April, Ukrainian officials estimated more than 400 cases in the occupied parts of Donetsk and Luhansk, and cast doubt on announcements by the LPR and DPR.

== See also ==
- COVID-19 pandemic in the Donetsk People's Republic
