= Daniel Ioniță (diplomat) =

Romanian diplomat

Daniel Ioniță is a Romanian diplomat. He was born on 2 February 1968 in Bucharest, Romania. He is currently the Romanian ambassador to Sweden and served in the past as the Romanian ambassador to Norway and to Moldova. He was also state secretary for the Ministry of Foreign Affairs of Romania. He has rich experience within diplomacy, having also held other relevant posts. He was awarded the National Order of Merit, Knight rank in 2002 and the National Order of Faithful Service, Officer rank in 2013. He is married to Lavinia Cătălina, with whom he had a daughter, Iris Maria (born in 1994).
