= COVID-19 pandemic in the Donetsk People's Republic =

Details of ongoing viral pandemic in the Donetsk People's Republic

2020 coronavirus pandemic in the Donetsk People's Republic
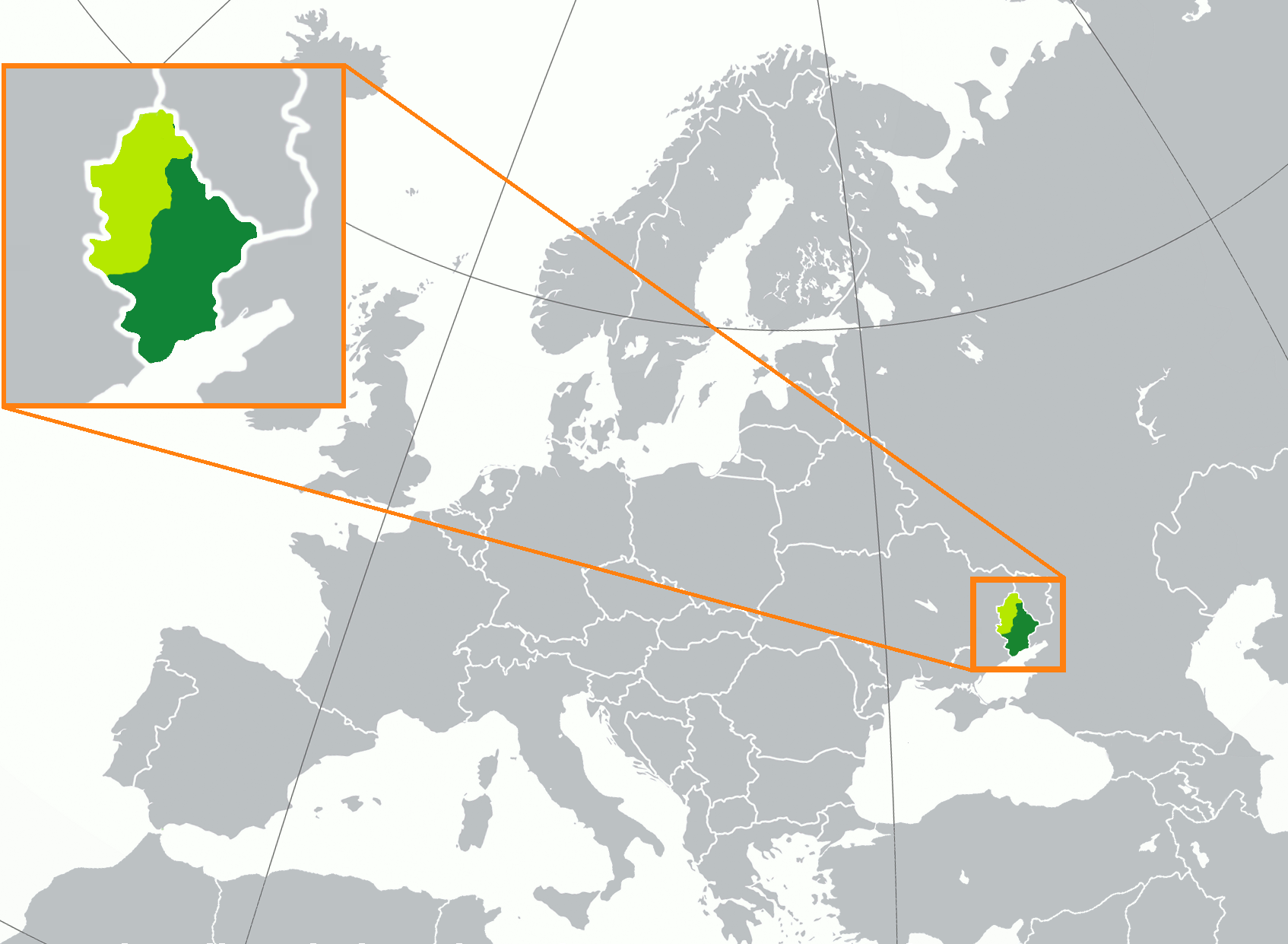
- Dark green: currently controlled territory since the 2022 invasion / Light green: rest of Donetsk Oblast
- Disease: COVID-19
- Pathogen: SARS-CoV-2
- Location: Donetsk People's Republic
- Arrival date: 31 March 2020 (6 years, 1 month, 2 weeks and 4 days)
- Recovered: 107,238
- Deaths: 9,202

The COVID-19 pandemic was confirmed to have reached the Donetsk People's Republic (DPR), a disputed Russian republic in eastern Ukraine, (Note: The Donetsk People's Republic (DPR) was established by Russian-backed separatists in the Donetsk Oblast of eastern Ukraine in 2014, during the war in Donbas. The disputed entity was annexed by Russia in 2022, during the 2022 Russian invasion of Ukraine. Russia regards the DPR as a Russian republic, a claim that is unrecognised by Ukraine and by most of the international community.) in March 2020.

== Background ==
On 12 January 2020, the World Health Organization (WHO) confirmed that a novel coronavirus was the cause of a respiratory illness in a cluster of people in Wuhan City, Hubei Province, China, which was reported to the WHO on 31 December 2019.

The case fatality ratio for COVID-19 has been much lower than SARS of 2003, but the transmission has been significantly greater, with a significant total death toll.

== Timeline ==
=== March 2020 ===
On March 13, the Minister of Internal Affairs of Ukraine Arsen Avakov stated that there were 12 patients with COVID-19 in Horlivka, a city in DPR-controlled territory.

As a precaution, on 28 March 2020, it was reported that the DPR had closed their borders, with exceptions for citizens of Russia, permanent residents of the DPR and employees of international organizations. Furthermore, mass events were banned.

On 31 March, the first case was announced by a health official of the DPR. The case was a woman who arrived on March 19 from Moscow, Russia, with her husband and young son.

=== April 2020 ===
On 1 April, the second case was confirmed. The patient is a child of the woman in the first case. The same day, the DPR further restricted its border policies by closing all customs posts with the neighboring LPR.

On 3 April, the third case was confirmed.

Ukraine's Ministry of Reintegration of the Temporarily Occupied Territories claimed that in Luhansk and Donetsk oblasts the real situation regarding the COVID-19 disease was being hidden from its population, and 10,000 people with COVID-19 symptoms were diagnosed with SARS in April. According to the Ministry, the first death from COVID-19 in the territory of Donbas region occurred on 4 April 2020 in Amvrosiivka. They would later rise in their thousands. This was not confirmed by the DPR.

On 7 April, the Donetsk People's Republic administration acknowledged the existence of 6 cases of infection.

On 8 April, another case of the disease was confirmed in a 35-year-old man who had returned from Russia.

On April 10, 5 more cases of infection were confirmed. A total of 13,792 people in the DPR territory were self-isolating.

On 17 April, the number of confirmed infections was elevated to 32.

On 22 April, 36 cases of infection were confirmed in the DPR.

=== May 2020 ===
By May, the cases and subsequent deaths amounted to so many that individual cases were no longer tracked.

=== June 2020 ===
With the situation slowly improving, some restrictions were gradually lifted. Cases and deaths would later rise and fall several times before vaccines were introduced in 2021.

== See also ==
- COVID-19 pandemic in the Luhansk People's Republic
