= Fire Shield =

Moldovan–Romanian joint military exercise

Fire Shield Scutul de Foc
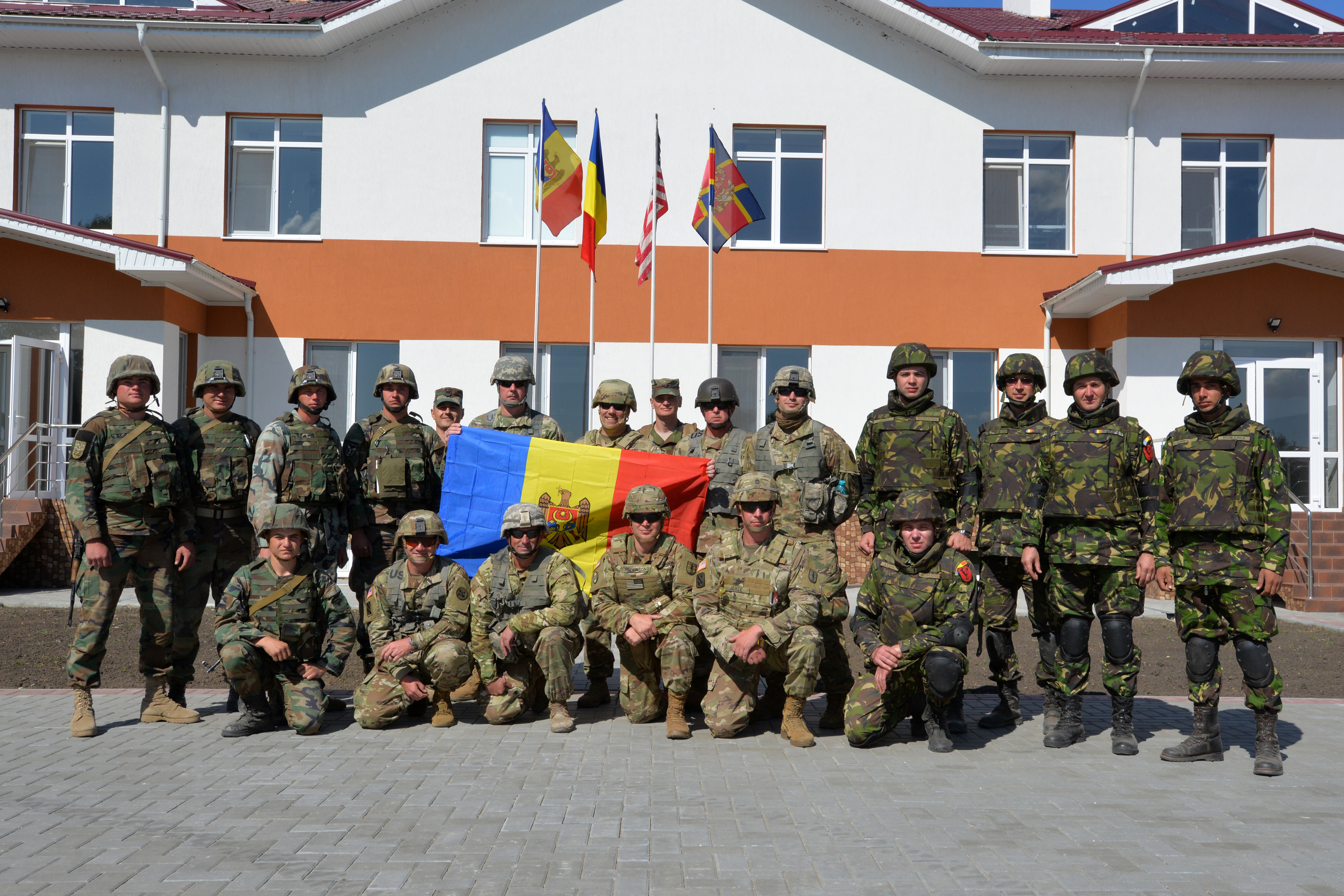
- Moldovan soldiers with US and Romanian soldiers at the Fire Shield 2019 closing ceremony
- Status: Active
- Locations: Bulboaca Military Training Base; Smârdan Training Area
- Country: Moldova; Romania
- Years active: 2015–present
- Inaugurated: 3 September 2015
- Attendance: Moldovan Armed Forces; Romanian Armed Forces; United States Armed Forces

Fire Shield (Romanian: Scutul de Foc) is a military exercise that takes place in Moldova and Romania. The exercise aims to increase the interoperability level and improve the coordination process of military operations in a multinational framework. Since 2016, the exercise is held on rotation at the Bulboaca and Smârdan training ranges in Moldova, and Romania respectively.

== History ==
Following a 2013 agreement between the Government of Romania and the Government of Moldova on cooperation in the military field, the first iteration of Fire Shield was organized between 3 September and 2 October 2015. The exercise took place at the Bulboaca Military Training Base in Moldova.

Over 600 soldiers from the Moldovan Army took part in the exercise. Participating units included the Moldovan 3rd Motorized Infantry Brigade and the 22nd Peacekeeping Battalion, as well as a platoon of the Romanian 52nd Mixed Artillery Regiment. The exercise was attended by Moldovan Minister of Defense Anatol Șalaru, the Secretary of the Supreme Security Council Alexei Barbăneagră, the Romanian ambassador Marius Lazurca, and the deputy commander of the US 4th Infantry Division, Timothy J. Daugherty.

In 2016, the first stage of the exercise took place at Bulboaca with the participation of 223 Moldovan soldiers, 30 soldiers from the Romanian 52nd Mixed Artillery Regiment, and 30 soldiers from the North Carolina Army National Guard. The second stage of the exercise took place at the Smârdan Training Range in Romania between 19 and 30 September.

In 2019, over 1,000 soldiers from Moldova, Romania, and the United States participated in the training exercises with artillery systems, engineering equipment, ground vehicles, trucks, and aircraft. The Romanian participation was represented by the 52nd Mixed Artillery Regiment, and the 151st Infantry Battalion of the 15th Mechanized Brigade.

During the 2020 exercise, the soldiers were strictly monitored by military doctors due to the COVID-19 pandemic.

The 2023 exercise was attended by some 500 soldiers and took place from 10 September until 22 September. The exercise was conducted simultaneously with the Rapid Trident exercise and US soldiers of the 101st Airborne Division assigned to the 10th Mountain Division also participated. Field training outside of the military training area was conducted for four days, followed by a live artillery fire demonstration on the Distinguished Visitors Day.

== Gallery ==
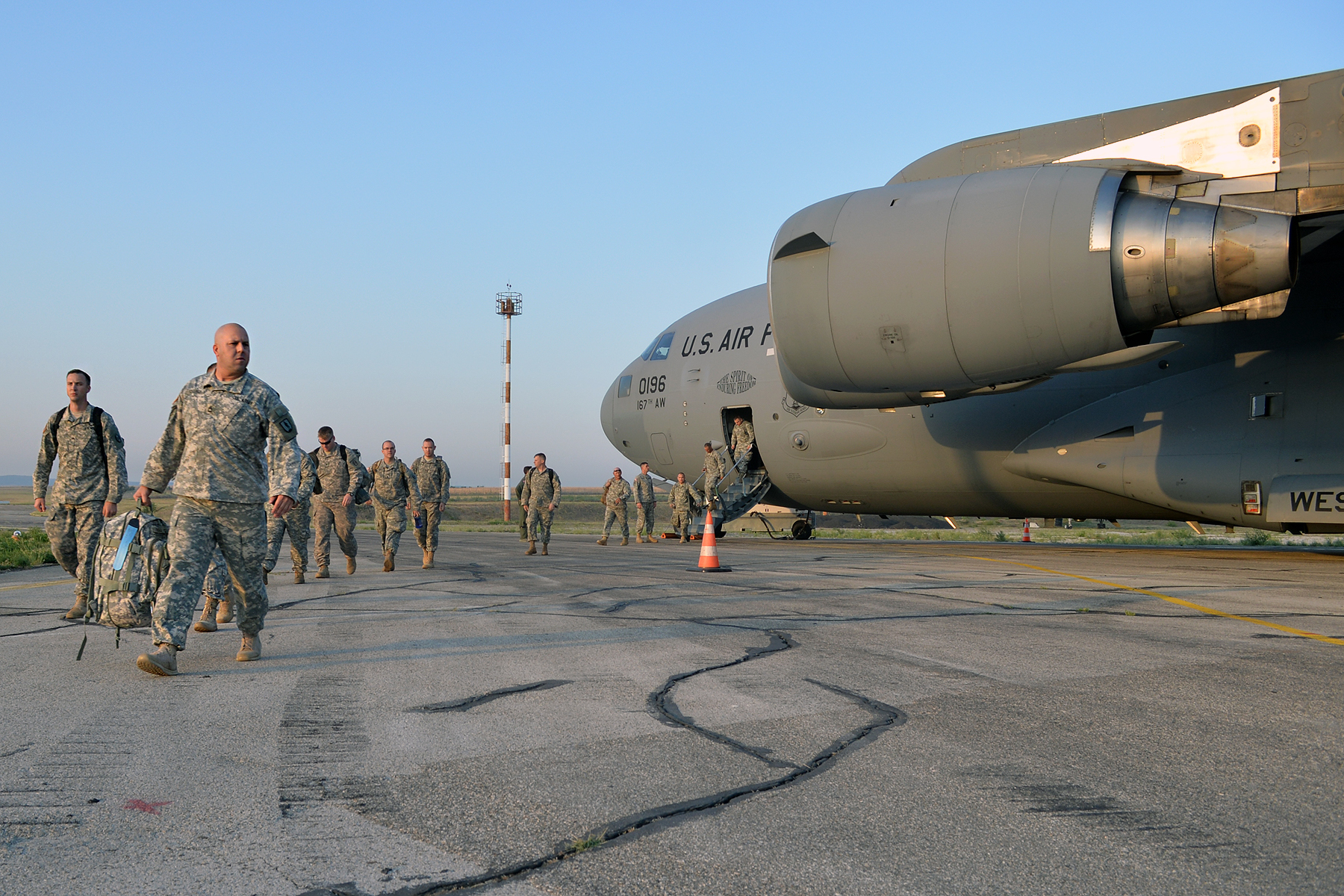
North Carolina National Guard Soldiers arriving in Moldova for Fire Shield 2016

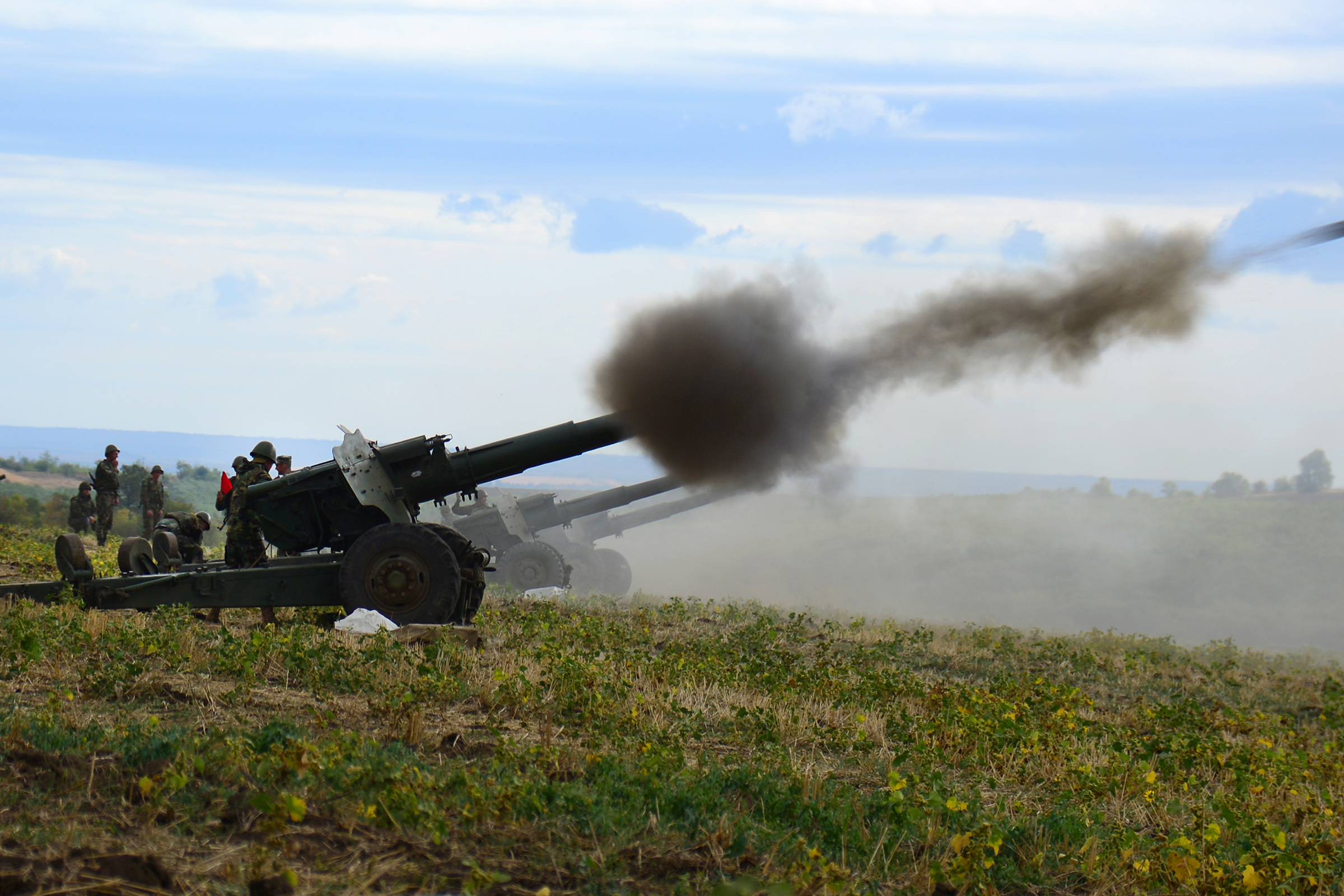
Moldovan howitzer battery live fire

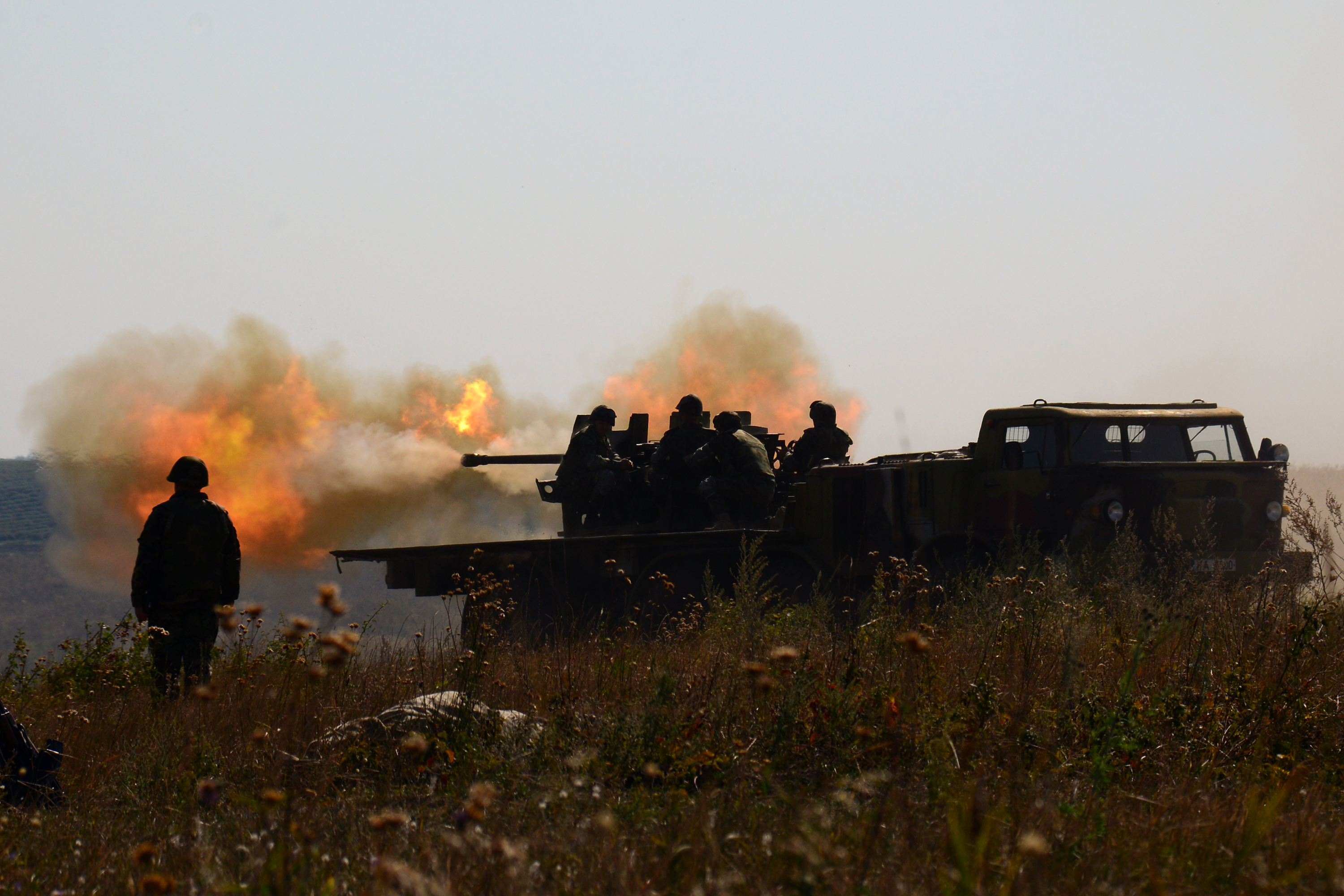
57 mm anti-aircraft gun at Fire Shield 2019

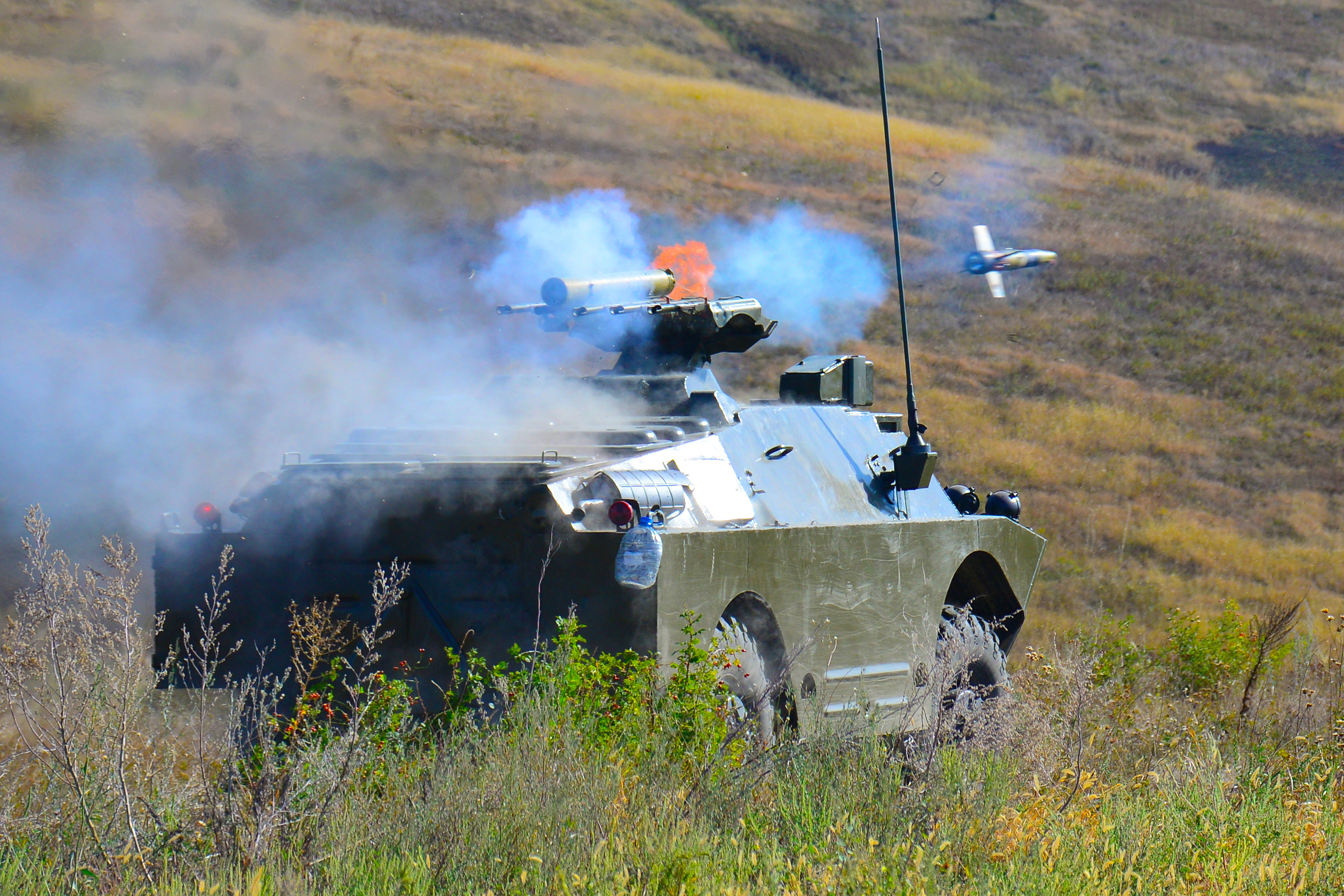
9M113 Konkurs wire-guided missile being launched

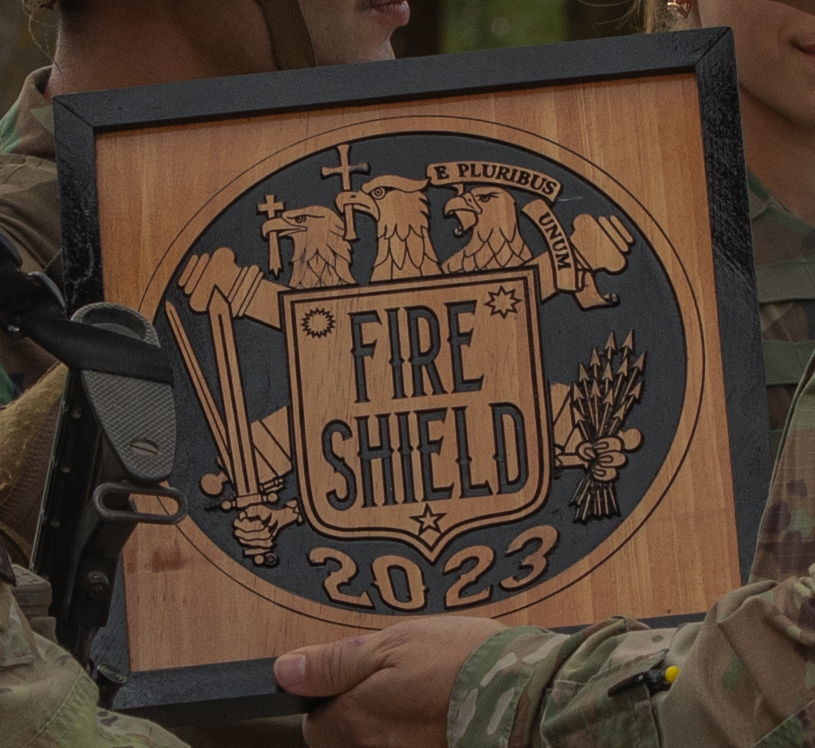
Fire Shield 2023 plaque

== See also ==
- Moldova–Romania relations
