= Embassy of Romania, Chișinău =

Diplomatic mission in Moldova

Coordinates: 47.0208°N 28.8296°E

Embassy of Romania in Chișinău
- Location: Chișinău
- Address: 66/1, București Str.
- Ambassador: Cristian-Leon Țurcanu

The Embassy of Romania in Chișinău (Romanian: Ambasada României în Republica Moldova) is the diplomatic mission of Romania to Moldova. The embassy is located in Central Chișinău, at 66/1 București Street.

== History ==
Romania was the first state to recognize the independence of Moldova on 27 August 1991. The Romanian embassy was the first diplomatic mission in Chișinău and was opened on 20 January 1992.

Filip Teodorescu (born 26 December 1951) was appointed as the Romanian ambassador to Chișinău in March 2003 and arrived at post in April 2003. After postelectoral violences from 7 April 2009, Moldovan President Vladimir Voronin announced that Romanian ambassador in Chișinău Filip Teodorescu was declared persona non grata and had 24 hours to leave the Moldovan territory. The following day, the Romanian parliament nominated a senior diplomat, Mihnea Constantinescu, as the new ambassador to Moldova, but two weeks later, the Moldovan government rejected him without any explanation, deepening the crisis.

Romania's Consul to Chișinău, Ion Nuică, forwarded his resignation on 13 July 2009, after a tape in which he was surprised in intimate scenes with a woman, supposedly employee at the Romanian Consulate in Chișinău. On 9 February 2010 the Parliament of Romania approved a new ambassador to Moldova; the ambassador, Marius Lazurca, has a PhD in history-anthropology from Paris-Sorbonne University and previously was ambassador to Holy See.

== Ambassadors ==
Name	Took office	Left office
Cristian-Leon Țurcanu	2022	
Daniel Ioniță	2016	2022
Marius Lazurcă	2010	2016
Filip Teodorescu	2003	2009
Adrian Bălănescu	2001	2003
Victor Bârsan	1999	2001
Nichita Danilov	1999	1999
Marcel Dinu	1997	1999

== See also ==
- Romanian diplomatic missions
- Moldova–Romania relations
