= Victor Bârsan =

Romanian diplomat

Romanian Ambassador to Moldova
- In office 1999–2001
- Preceded by: Nichita Danilov
- Succeeded by: Adrian Bălănescu

Personal details
- Born: September 28, 1950 (age 75)
- Education: University of Bucharest
- Profession: Diplomat

Victor Bârsan (born September 28, 1950) is a Romanian diplomat. He was the Romanian Ambassador to Moldova (1999–2001) and the editor in chief of Revista 22 (1991).

== Works ==
- Masacrul inocenților, 1993
- The Ilaşcu trial, 1994

== See also ==
- Embassy of Romania in Chişinău
- Moldovan–Romanian relations
