= Teodorescu =

Teodorescu is a Romanian surname. Notable people with the surname include:

- Constantin C. Teodorescu (1892–1972), engineer
- Emanoil C. Teodorescu (1866–1949), botanist
- Filip Teodorescu (born 1951), diplomat
- G. Dem. Teodorescu (1849–1900), folklorist and journalist
- Georgiana Teodorescu (born 1985), politician
- Ion Teodorescu (born 1976), rugby union player
- Margareta Teodorescu (1932–2013), chess player
- Nicolae Teodorescu (1797–1880), church painter
- Octave Octavian Teodorescu (born 1963), singer
- Sebastian Teodorescu (1880–1940), mayor
- Tudor Teodorescu-Braniște (1899–1969), journalist
- Victor Teodorescu (1925–20??), pentathlete
- Ted Dumitru (1939–2016), born Dumitru Teodorescu, football coach
- Elena Leușteanu (1935–2008), gymnast, sometimes known under the married name of Teodorescu
- Sandu Tudor (1896–1962), born Alexandru Al. Teodorescu, poet and theologian

== See also ==
- 65001 Teodorescu, a main-belt asteroid
- Theodorescu
