= Marcel Dinu =

Romanian diplomat (1935–2019)

Romanian Ambassador to Germany
- In office October 1986 – February 1990
- Preceded by: Ion Râmbu
- Succeeded by: Radu Comșa

Romanian Ambassador to Moldova
- In office February 1997 – February 1999
- Preceded by: Marian Enache
- Succeeded by: Nichita Danilov

Romanian Ambassador to Egypt
- In office 2001–2005
- Preceded by: Doru Romulus Costea
- Succeeded by: Gheorghe Dumitru

Personal details
- Born: 24 July 1935 Silistra, Kingdom of Romania
- Died: January 22, 2019 (aged 83) Bucharest, Romania
- Spouse: Maria Dinu
- Children: 3
- Education: Technical University of Civil Engineering of Bucharest; University of Bucharest
- Profession: Civil engineer, Diplomat

Marcel Dinu (24 July 1935–22 January 2019) was a Romanian diplomat. He was the Romanian Ambassador to Germany, Moldova, and Egypt.

Dinu was born in 1935 in Silistra, at the time in the Kingdom of Romania, later in Bulgaria. He studied engineering at Faculty of Civil and Industrial Engineering in Bucharest from 1953 to 1958, and then worked as an engineer at a construction company in Brazi until 1962. After completing his post-graduate studies at the Law School of the University of Bucharest, he joined the Ministry of External Affairs in 1964 and served in the diplomatic corps until 2006. He served as Romania's Ambassador to Germany (October 1986 to February 1990), Moldova (February 1997 to February 1999), and Egypt (2001 to 2005). He died in Bucharest in 2019, at age 83.

== See also ==
- Embassy of Romania, Chișinău
- Moldova–Romania relations
