= Theodorescu =

Theodorescu is a Romanian surname. Notable people with the surname include:

- The Arghezi family, which adopted the "Arghezi" surname in April 1956; namely:
  - Tudor Arghezi (1880–1967), born Ion N. Theodorescu, writer and political figure
  - Eli Lotar (1905–1969), born Eliazar Lotar Theodorescu, photographer and filmmaker
  - Mitzura Arghezi (1924–2015), born Domnica Theodorescu, actress, illustrator, ballerina and politician
  - Baruțu T. Arghezi (1925–2010), born Iosif Theodorescu, writer, activist and physical trainer
- Cicerone Theodorescu (1908–1974), poet
- Dem. Theodorescu (1888–1946), journalist and critic
- George Theodorescu (1925–2006), equestrian
- Ion Theodorescu-Sion (1882–1939), painter
- Monica Theodorescu (1963–), equestrian and dressage rider
- Răzvan Theodorescu (1939–2023), historian and politician

== See also ==
- Teodorescu
