= Rapid Trident =

Rapid Trident (Ukrainian: Швидкий тризуб) is an annual training exercise between Ukrainian, United States, and other military forces. "Rapid Trident" military exercises were usually conducted on the Yavoriv military training ground since 2006 as part of NATO's "Partnership for Peace" program with the participation of military personnel of NATO countries. Their purpose is to prepare for joint actions as part of multinational forces during coalition operations.

== Rapid Trident 2013 ==
More than 1,300 servicemen from 16 countries took part in the RapidTrident-2013 exercise. More than 800 weapons and almost 170 military vehicles and combat vehicles were involved in the event. Four Mi-8 helicopters, an AN-26 military transport aircraft from the Armed Forces of Ukraine and a German C-160 transport aircraft were used to practice the airmobile operation and elements of evacuating the wounded from the battlefield. During the training, more than 500 parachute jumps were made from Mil Mi-8 helicopters, Ukrainian Antonov An-26 aircraft and German Transall C-160s.

== Rapid Trident 2014 ==
The RapidTrident-2014 exercise, which took place from September 11 to 28, involved 1,200 (according to other sources, 1,300) servicemen from 12 NATO member states, as well as Azerbaijan, Georgia, and Moldova.

== Rapid Trident 2015 ==
1,800 servicemen from 18 countries took part in the RapidTrident-2015 exercise, which took place from July 20 to 31. Ukraine was represented at the exercises by about 800 military personnel, namely paratroopers, scouts, a special purpose group, National Guard fighters and cadets of military academies, in particular the Lviv Academy of Ground Forces. Among the foreign participants in the exercises are representatives of Belgium, Bulgaria, Great Britain, Georgia, Estonia, Spain, Canada, Latvia, Lithuania, Moldova, Germany, Norway, Poland, Romania, the USA, Turkey and Sweden. There are more than 500 Americans, but Belgium is represented by only one serviceman. The guests brought with them almost 900 weapons, about 130 military vehicles and cars. Training shootings with small arms will take place, armored vehicles and helicopters of the army aviation will be involved.

== Rapid Trident 2016 ==
More than 1,800 servicemen from 13 countries will take part in the "RapidTrident-2016" exercise, which will take place from June 27, 2016 to July 11, 2016 at the Yavoriv training ground (Lviv region). In addition to Ukrainian servicemen, soldiers and officers from the USA, Canada, Great Britain, Bulgaria, Lithuania, Turkey, Romania, Georgia, Moldova, Poland, Norway and Sweden were involved in the exercises[6]. The largest foreign contingents are from the US and Canadian armies. More than 400 people in total. The domestic group involved in international military training is represented by servicemen of one of the combat brigades of the Ground Forces of the Armed Forces of Ukraine, servicemen of the Airborne Forces of the Armed Forces of Ukraine, the Marine Corps, cadets of the National Academy of Ground Forces named after Hetman Petro Sahaydachny, the Military Academy from the city of Odesa, and a separate unit of the National Guard of Ukraine. The vast majority of Ukrainian servicemen with experience of participating in hostilities in the ATO zone[7]. Military personnel of the LITPOLUKRBRIG, a multinational brigade that was created in 2014, will also be involved in the training. More than 200 units of military vehicles and armored combat vehicles and 2 Mi-8 helicopters will be used during the practical exercises. On June 28, 2016, as part of the exercises, a platoon of Ukrainian marines performed a practical task of capturing an important border. The military needed to take control and secure positions near a strategically important facility - the dam crossing. In the role of the conditional adversary ("OPFOR"), fighters of the joint unit - cadets of the Odessa Military Academy and servicemen from Bulgaria - acted. The Ukrainian military acted in an aggressive style, the attack was carried out professionally, despite the rain and the actions of the enemy. However, the marines had one conditionally "wounded" fighter and one conditionally "dead" soldier after the training operation. UK

== Rapid Trident 2018 ==
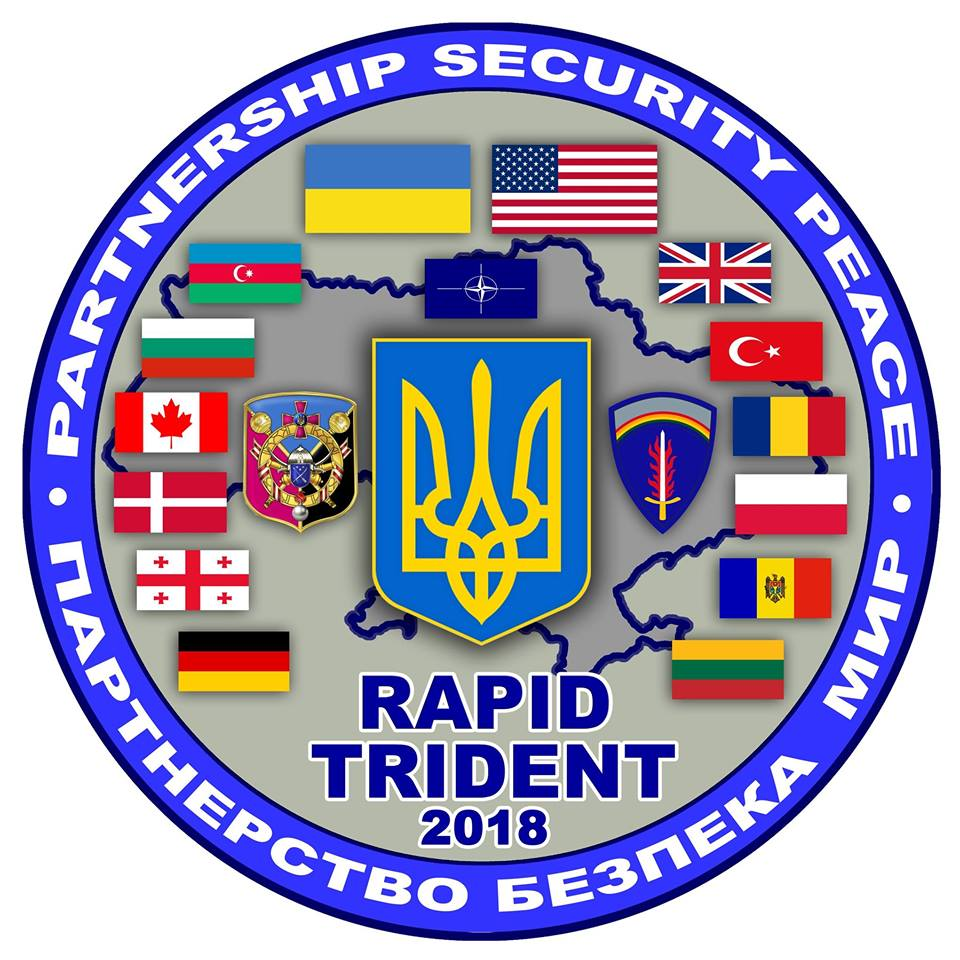
Rapid Trident 2018 logo

On September 3, 2018, on the basis of the International Center for Peacekeeping and Security of the National Academy of Land Forces named after Hetman Petro Sahaidachny, the opening of the multinational Ukrainian-American command and staff exercise involving troops "Rapid Trident - 2018" took place. The ceremony was attended by personnel and contingent commanders of all countries participating in the exercise, co-leaders of the exercise from Ukraine — Major General Eduard Moskalyov from the United States of America — Colonel Tim Cleveland, representatives of state bodies of the co-leader countries and exercise participants. "Rapid Trident - 2018" became the largest joint land exercise of units of the Armed Forces of Ukraine, other military formations of Ukraine (National Guard of Ukraine, State Border Service of Ukraine and the State Security Directorate) and military units of foreign countries. It was attended by military units of 10 NATO member countries and 4 NATO partner countries, a total of 14 countries, namely Ukraine, USA, Azerbaijan, Bulgaria, Great Britain, Georgia, Denmark, Canada, Lithuania, Moldova, Germany, Romania, Poland, Turkey. Military personnel of the multinational Lithuanian-Polish-Ukrainian brigade named after the Great Hetman Kostiantyn Ostrozky are also participating in this year's "Rapid Trident-2018". More than 350 units of equipment and more than 2,200 servicemen are involved in the training, and two phases of the training are provided - command and staff and field. During this time, the Ukrainian military and their colleagues from partner countries are practicing a number of tasks of a combat, logistical and humanitarian nature. More details on the official training page Rapid Trident 2018 Facebook page. UK

== Rapid Trident 2019 ==
On September 16, 2019, the annual Ukrainian-American command and staff military exercise Rapid Trident ("Rapid trident-2019") began in the Lviv region at the International Center for Peacekeeping and Security. About 3,800 military personnel from 14 countries of the world - members and partners of NATO, namely the USA, Canada, Poland, Great Britain, Lithuania, Moldova, Georgia and Ukraine - will practice combat skills together for two weeks. This year, for the first time, a Ukrainian team is participating in such a school. This is the 10th separate mountain assault brigade, which at the same time is also training at the Yavoriv training ground as part of joint Ukrainian-NATO exercises. The National Guard, National Police and border guards also take part in the exercises. This year, about 3,800 servicemen from 14 countries are taking part in the Rapid Trident-2019 international exercises at the Yavoriv training ground, and this is an even larger-scale exercise than last year, when 2,200 servicemen trained together. Almost 700 units of automotive equipment and combat armored vehicles, 4 Mi-8 helicopters of the army aviation brigade, which is twice as much as in 2018, were involved in the training ground. As part of Rapid Trident, military personnel will be able to simulate the actions of both their units and a hypothetical enemy with the help of computers and special software. The training scenario includes practicing combat operations during the water capture of the territory and the liberation of the settlement from the enemy.

== Rapid Trident 2021 ==
About 6,000 servicemen from 15 countries took part in the exercises, which lasted from September 20 to October 1, 2021.

== Gallery ==
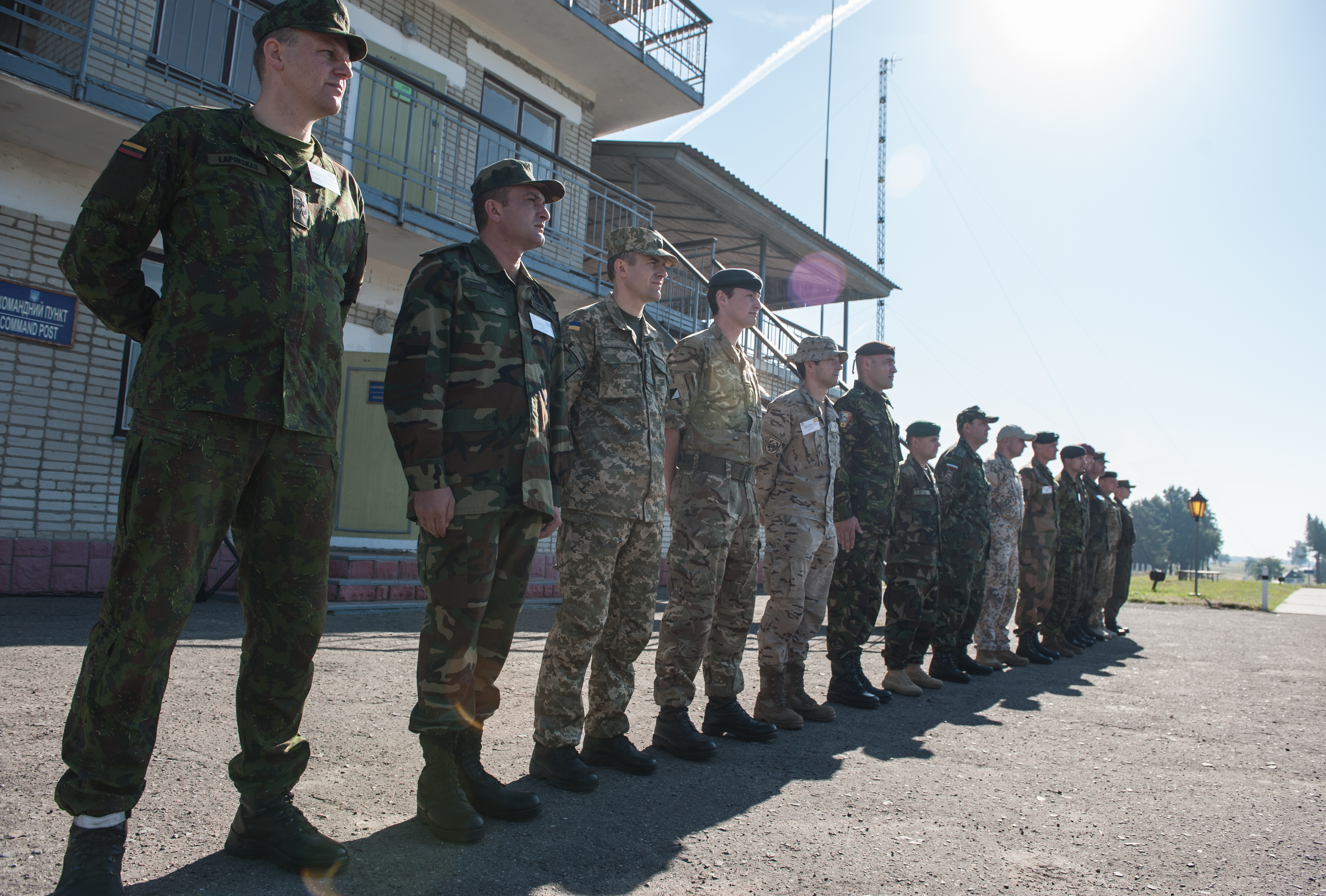
Military personnel from participating countries in the "Rapid Trident-2014" exercise assembling in front of the command post of the training center, on September 19, 2014.

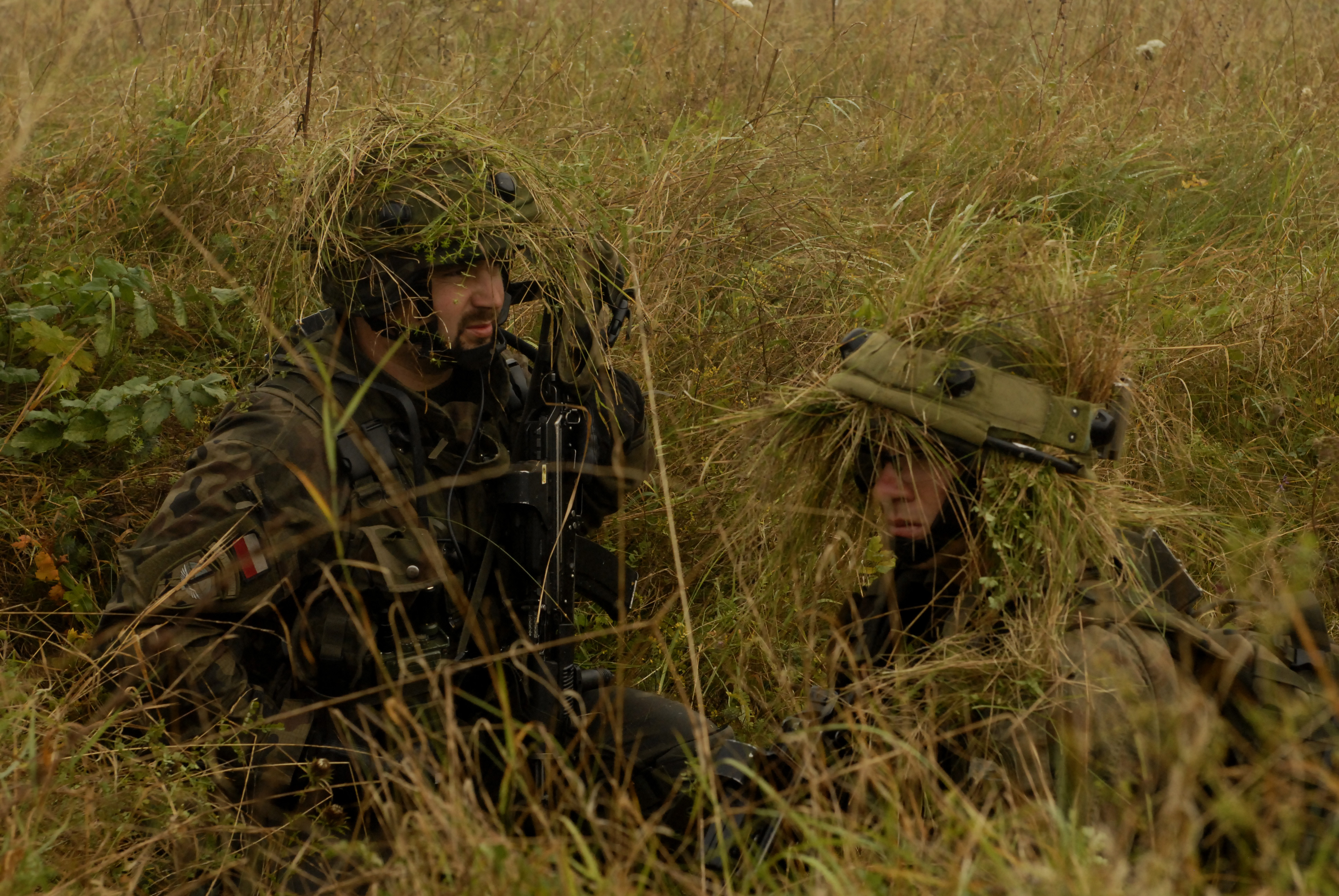
Polish soldiers are preparing for an ambush during the "Rapid Trident-2007" exercise, on August 22, 2007.

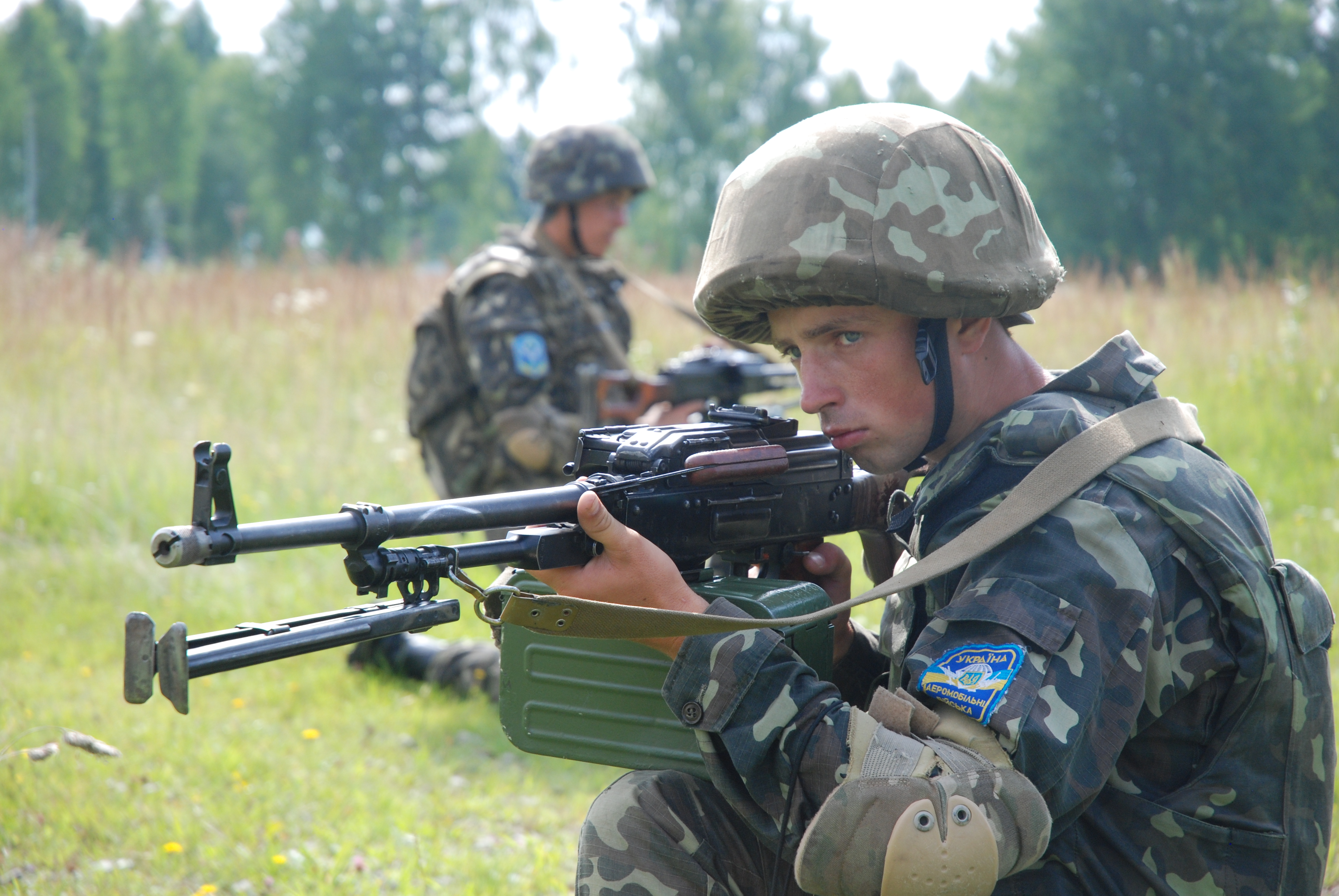
Ukrainian soldiers during the "Rapid Trident-2011" exercise, on July 9, 2011.

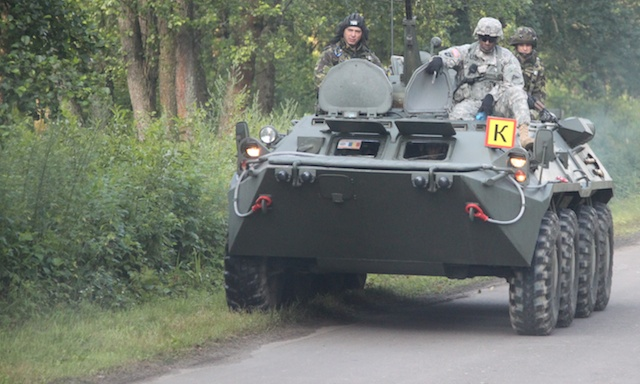
American, Serbian, and German soldiers on a Romanian armored personnel carrier during the "Rapid Trident-2012" exercise, on July 17, 2012.

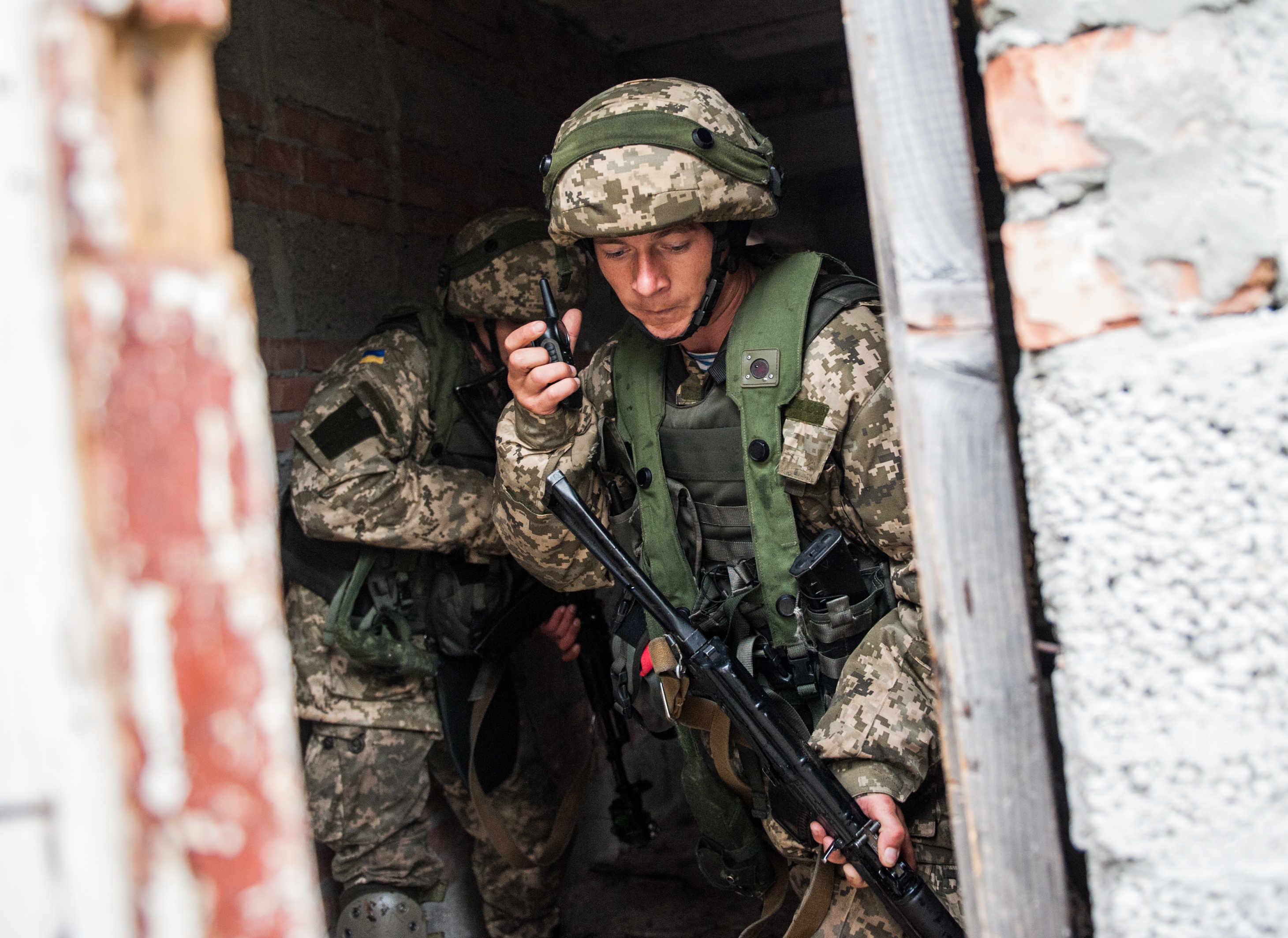
Ukrainian soldiers during the "Rapid Trident-2014" exercise, on September 23, 2014.

The performance of an American vocal-instrumental band in front of the participants of the "Rapid Trident-2014" exercise, on September 20, 2014.

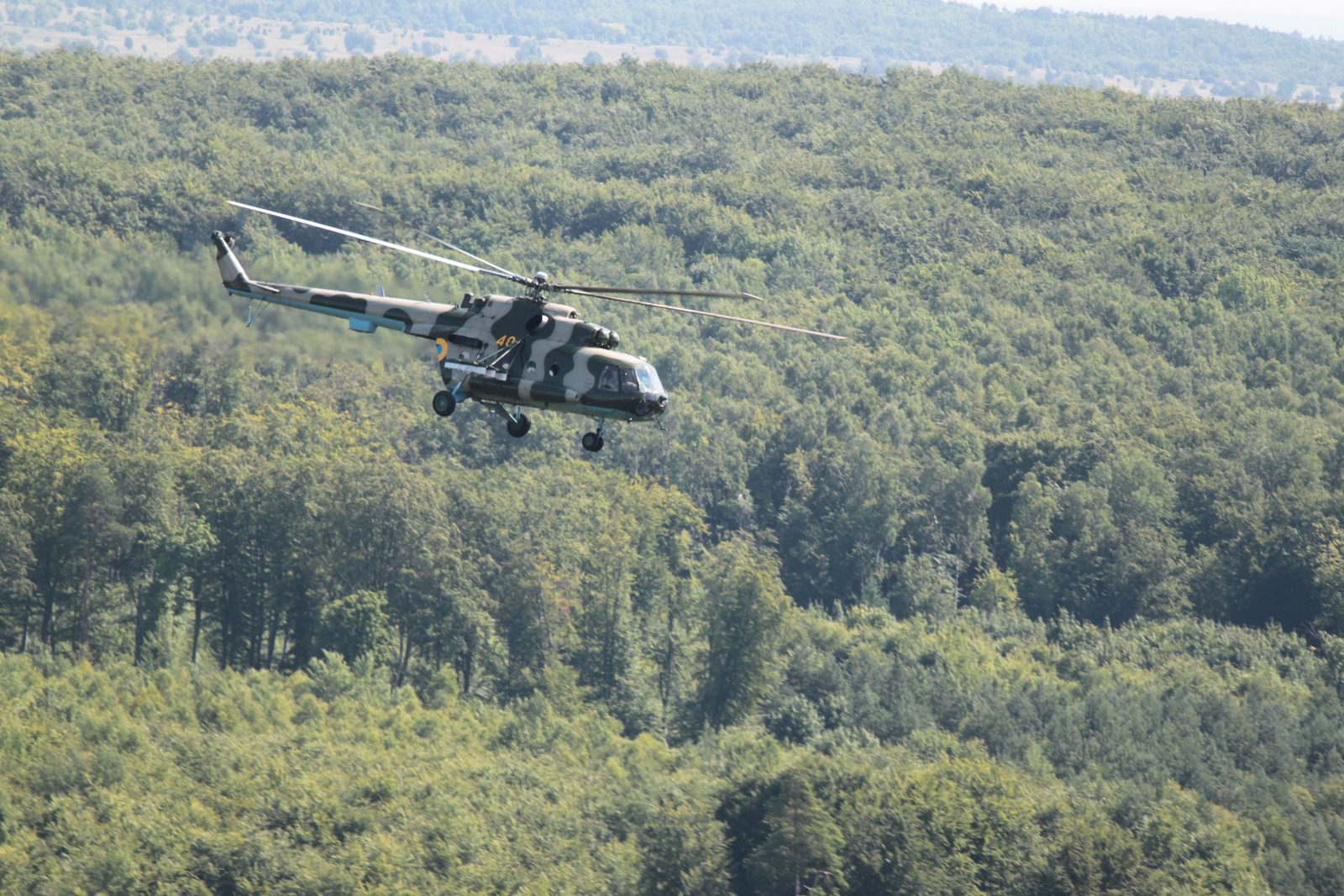
A Ukrainian Mi-8 helicopter transporting paratroopers during the "Rapid Trident-2013" exercise, on July 9, 2013.

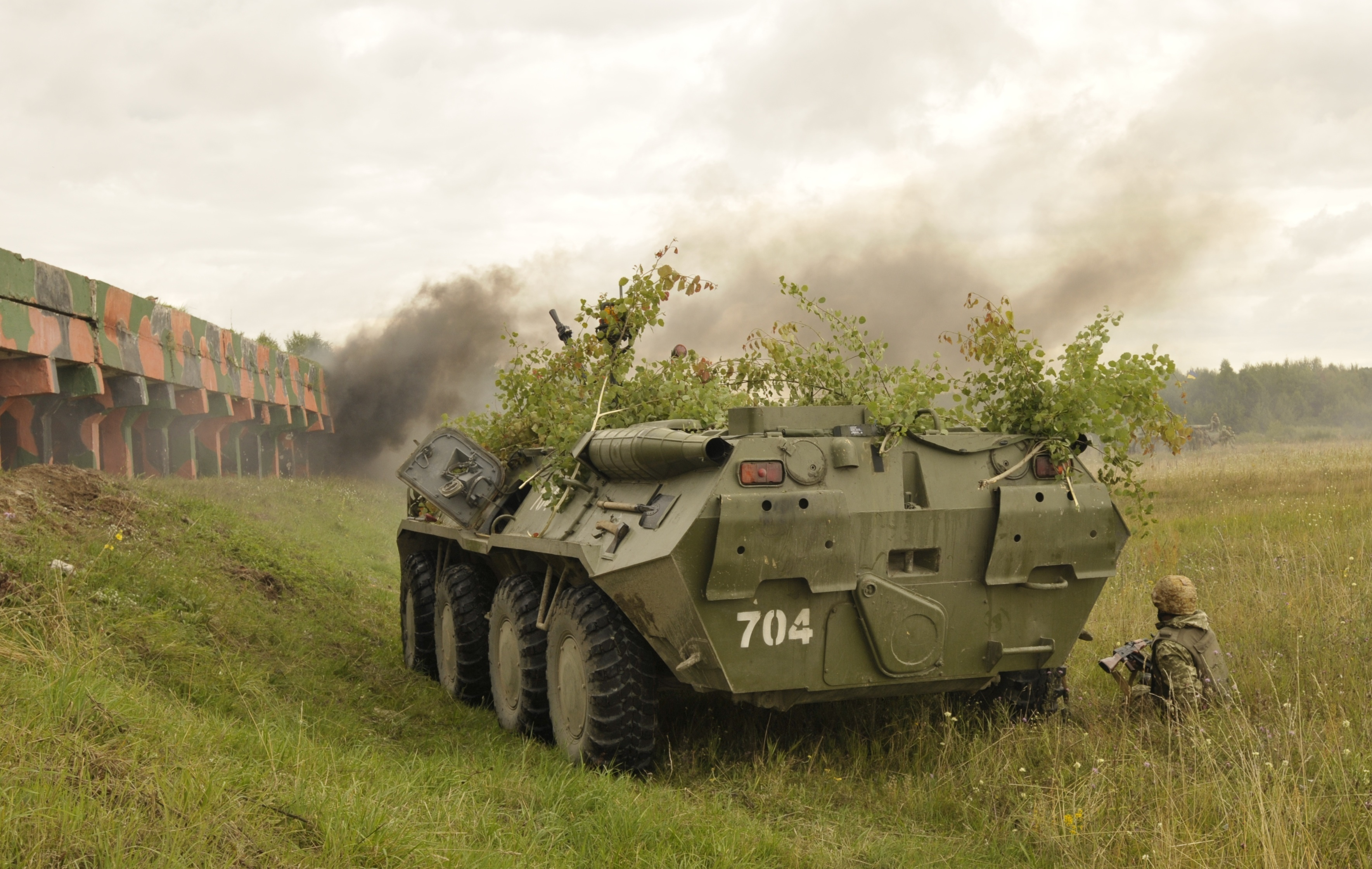
Practice of a BTR-80 assault by the paratroopers. "Rapid Trident-2015".

== See also ==
- Aerorozvidka
- Fire Shield
