= Filip Teodorescu =

Romanian diplomat

Romanian Ambassador to Moldova
- In office 2003–2009
- Succeeded by: Marius Lazurcă

Romanian Ambassador to Albania
- In office 1997–2001

Personal details
- Born: December 26, 1951 (age 74)
- Children: 1
- Education: University of Bucharest
- Profession: Diplomat

Filip Teodorescu (born December 26, 1951) is former colonel of the Communist secret service "Securitate" and later a Romanian diplomat. He was the Romanian Ambassador to Moldova (2003–2009).

== Biography ==
Filip Teodorescu is a former colonel of the Romanian secret service "Securitate", who served as deputy head of the Counterintelligence Directorate of the State Security Department. In this quality he was put on trial for his role in trying to suppress the Romanian Revolution against the Communist Regime.

Filip Teodorescu was appointed as the Romanian ambassador to Chişinău in March 2003 and arrived at post in April 2003. On April 8, 2009, President of Moldova Vladimir Voronin declared Romanian Ambassador Filip Teodorescu and Councilor-Minister, Ioan Gaborean, personae non gratae, claiming that "their activity was inconsistent with their diplomatic status" after the 2009 Moldova civil unrest. But the new Minister of Foreign Affairs and European Integration (Moldova), Iurie Leancă, canceled this decision.

== See also ==
- Embassy of Romania in Chişinău
- Moldovan–Romanian relations
