= Nichita Danilov =

Romanian poet

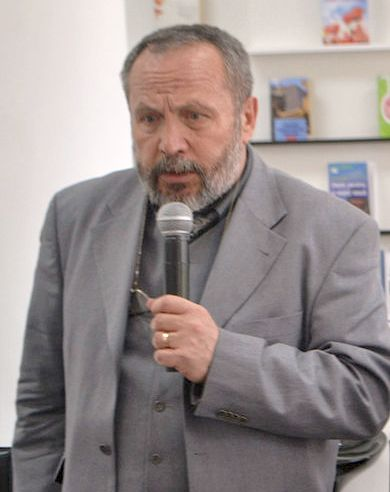

Romanian Ambassador to Moldova
- In office February 1999 – 1999
- Preceded by: Marcel Dinu
- Succeeded by: Victor Bârsan

Personal details
- Born: April 7, 1952 (age 74) Climăuţi, Suceava County, Romania
- Education: University of Iași
- Profession: Diplomat

Nichita Danilov (born April 7, 1952, in Climăuţi village, Suceava County) is a Romanian poet. He served as the acting ambassador of Romania to Moldova in 1999. Nichita Danilov is ethnically Lipovan.

== Early life ==
Danilov graduated from the Architecture College and the Faculty of Economics in Iași. He made his debut in the Dialog literary review with a selection of poems.

== Published works ==
- Cartesian Wells (Fîntîni carteziene), Junimea Publishing House, 1980
- Black Field (Cîmpul negru), Cartea Romaneasca Publishing House, 1982
- Harlequins by the Edge of the Field (Arlechini la marginea cîmpului), Cartea Romaneasca Publishing House, 1985
- Poems (Poeme), Junimea Publishing House, 1987; Over Things, Nothingness, (Deasupra lucrurilor, neantul), Cartea Romaneasca Publishing House, 1990
- Over Things, Nothingness – Au-Dessus Des Choses, Le Neant, (bilingual edition Romanian- French translated by Emanoil Marcu), Editura Axa, 1997, Botosani
- Ragged Ear (Urechea de cîrpă), short stories and pamphlets, Boema, 1993
- Cardboard Apocalypse (Apocalipsa de carton), essays, Institutul European Publishing House 1995
- The Blind Bridegroom (Mirele orb), poems, Moldova Publishing House, 1996
- Hans Wife (Nevasta lui Hans), prose, Moldova Publishing House, 1996
- Scene with walls and doors (Peisaj cu ziduri și uși, bilingual edition Romanian- English, translated by Sean Cotter, SUA), poems, 2000, Augusta Publishing House
- Souls from Second Hand (Suflete la Second Hand), poems, 1999, Vinea Publishing House, 2000
- In the desert and on the waters (În deșert și pe ape), poems, Prut International Publishing House 2001

Danilov's poems can also be found in the Anthology of Romanian Poets edited by Laurențiu Ulici, Anthology of the Poetry of the Generation of the 80s, edited by Alexandru Musina, Anthology of Romanian Poetry from Its Origins to the Present Time, edited by Dumitru Chioaru and Radu Văcărescu, The Romanian Writers' Dictionary, edited by the Romanian Academy, Contemporary Poetry, edited by Marin Mincu a.s.o. Some of his poems have been translated in other languages and published in several anthologies or literary magazines, or example Hungary, USA, Great Britain, Czechoslovakia, Spain, France, Latvia. Adam J. Sorkin, Sean Cotter, Brenda Walker, Elena Loghinovski, Maria Dinescu, Leons Briedis, Emanoil Marcu, Lidia Nasinek are some translators that have translated his poems.

He is editor-in-chief of the bilingual (Romanian-Russian) literary magazine Kitej-grad and the main manager of the Iaşi Cultural House. He also works as a journalist for Ziarul de Iaşi. He is also a member of the Writers' Union of Romania (since 1980), a COPYRO member, and also a European PEN Club member.

== Awards and honors ==
Danilov has been awarded several honors, including prizes from the Writers' Union of Romania (1980), the Iaşi Writers' Association (1982, 1985, 1991, 1995), the Soros Foundation Award (1995), and the Writers' Union of Moldova (1997, 2000).
