= Moldova–Romania relations =

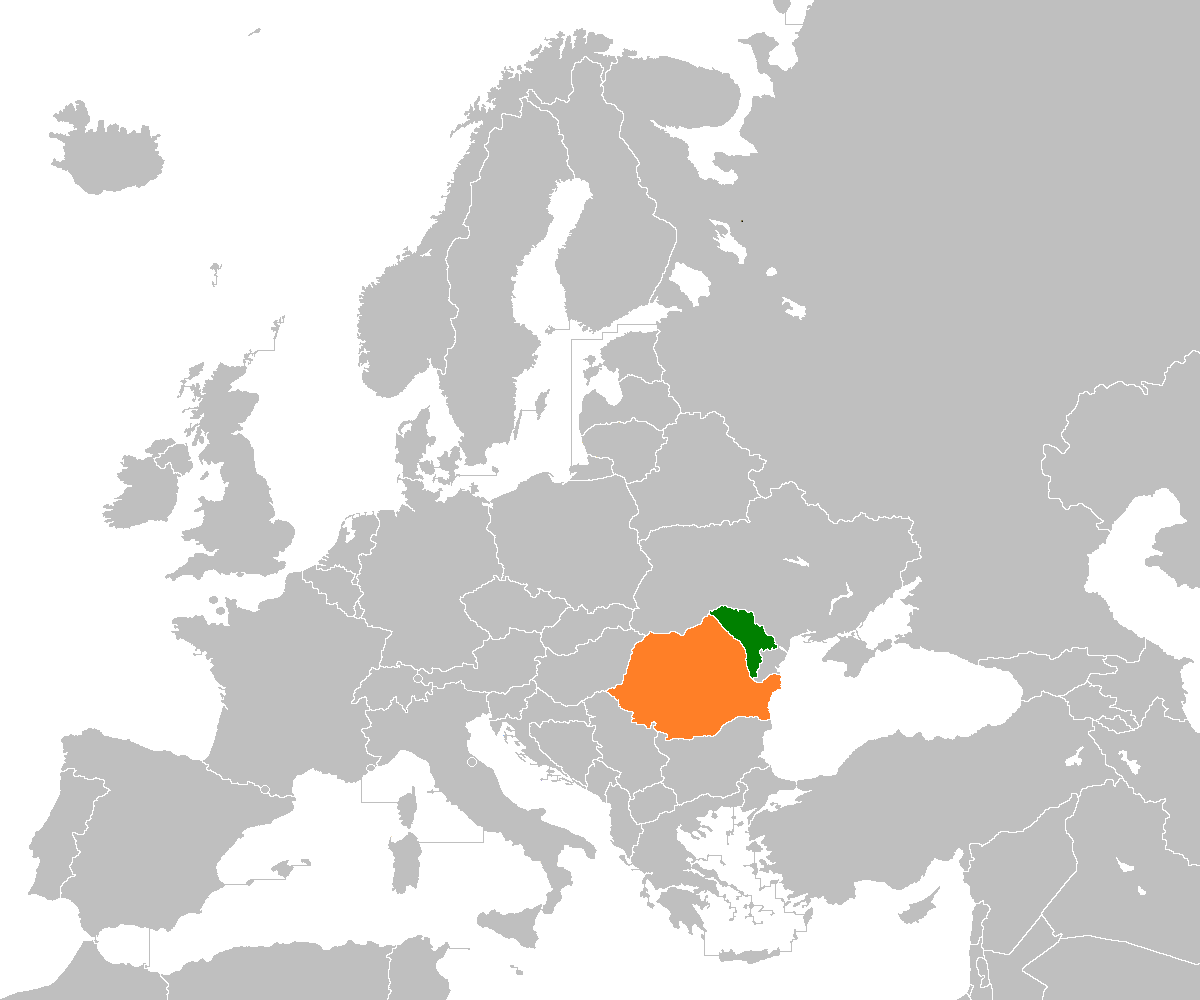

- Moldova: Romania

Diplomatic mission
- Embassy of Moldova, Bucharest: Embassy of Romania, Chișinău

Envoy
- Ambassador Mihai Gribincea: Ambassador Daniel Ioniță

The modern relations between the Republic of Moldova and Romania (Romanian: Relațiile dintre Republica Moldova și România) were established after the Moldovan independence from the Soviet Union on August 27, 1991. As of 2026, relations are very close on both a cultural and political scale, on the account of the Western-aligned administration of the Republic of Moldova, led by President Maia Sandu, who is in the office since 2020.

Pan-Romanianism has been a consistent part of Romanian and Moldovan politics in the early 1990s; however, the theme has become marginal afterwards, with no major Moldavian party endorsing it as of 2025. The official language of Moldova is Romanian, despite an active controversy regarding language name and ethnic identity. Moldovans and Romanians share common traditions and folklore.

The Republic of Moldova represents a part of the former Principality of Moldavia. After the Treaty of Bucharest, which put an end of the Russo-Turkish War of 1806-1812, the eastern half was ceded by its Ottoman suzerain to the Russian Empire, which annexed it as the Bessarabia Governorate. The western half remained under Ottoman rule and united with Wallachia in 1859, forming the modern Romanian state.

In 1918, after the Romanian army occupied its territory, Bessarabia became part of Romania, the Romanian administration lasting for 22 years. In 1940, it was annexed by the Soviet Union, most of the province becoming the new Moldavian Soviet Socialist Republic. In 1991, it declared its independence and Romania was the first country to recognize its sovereignty, but most of the initial momentum for a union was lost following the Transnistrian War.

As of 2025, the two co-exist as bordering states, with high and moderate support for a union in Romania and Moldova respectively. Romania is one of the most important partners of Moldova and a key feature in Moldovan politics. Romania is a member state of the European Union, while the Republic of Moldova is a candidate.

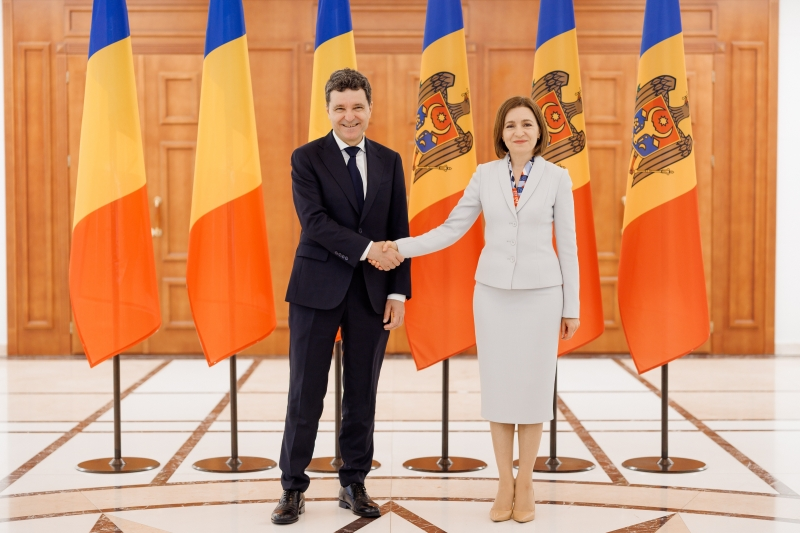
Romanian President Nicușor Dan and Moldovan President Maia Sandu

== Border between the Republic of Moldova and Romania ==
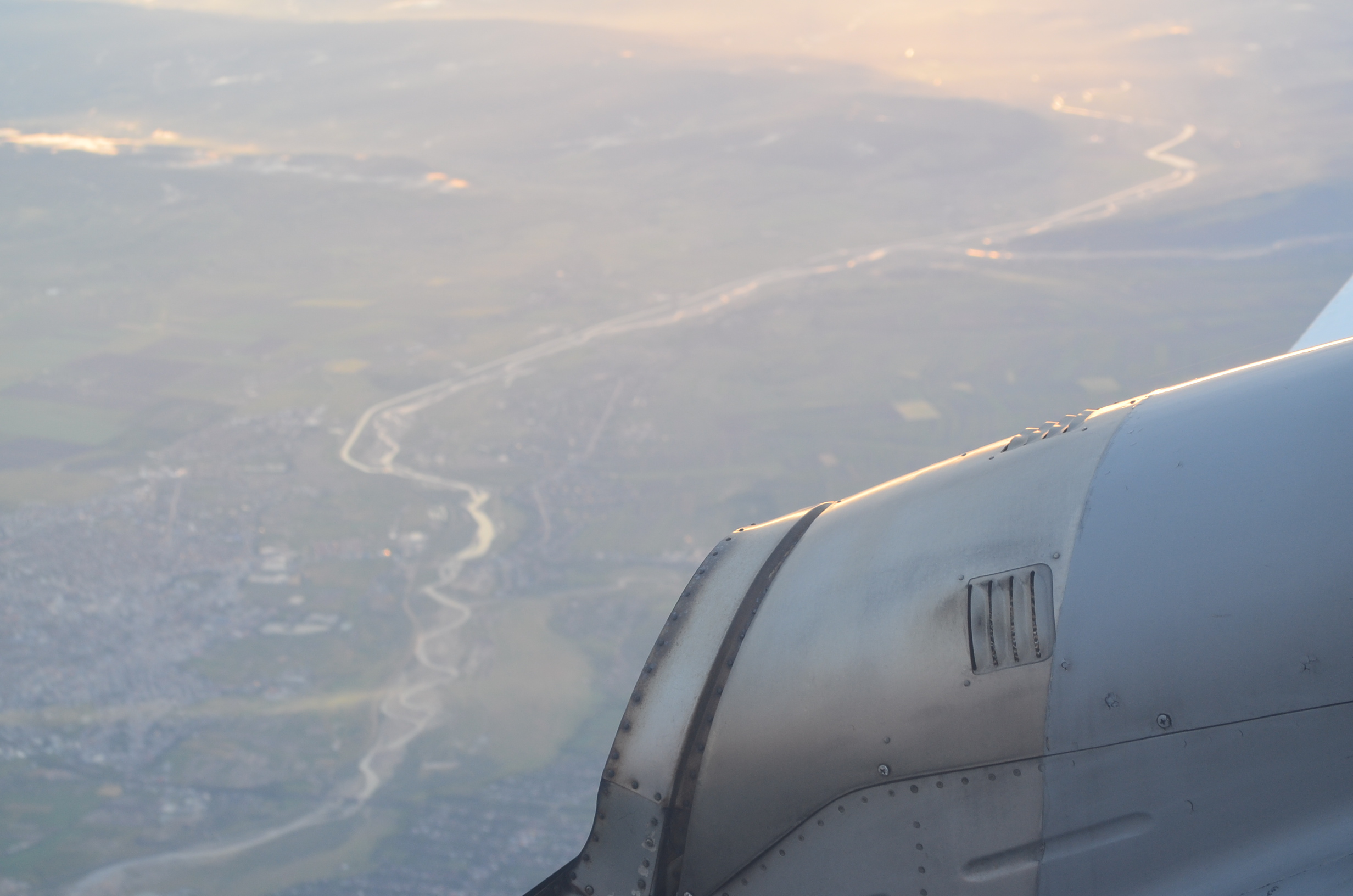
Aerial view of the Prut river, separating Romania and the Republic of Moldova

The border between the two states was established in 1991, after previously serving as the border between Romania and the Soviet Union since 1945. It is a fully fluvial boundary, following the course of the Prut river for 680.8 kilometres, and a negligible part following the course of the Danube.

The border starts at the tripoint with Ukraine, close to the villages of Criva (on the Moldovan side) and Păltiniș (on the Romanian side), and ends at another tripoint with Ukraine, close to Giurgiulești (Moldova) and Galați (Romania). As neither Ukraine or Moldova are part of the European Union, Romania's border with both represents an external border of the European Union.

The border is spanned by eight crossing points, five of which are road crossings and three are railway crossings. The most important of those are the Sculeni Bridge and Leușeni-Albița Bridge (routier) and the Eiffel Bridge (railway).

== History ==
In 1918, at the end of World War I, Transylvania, Bukovina and Bessarabia united with the Romanian Old Kingdom. Bessarabia, having declared its sovereignty in 1917 by the newly elected Council of the Country (Sfatul Țării), was faced with bolshevik agitation among the Russian troops and Ukrainian claims to parts of its territory. The president of the Council of the Country called on the Russian Commander-in-Chief in Iași, Dmitry Shcherbachev, to send troops to protect the country. Having no troops, he transmitted the request to the Romanians, whose military intervention was met with protest by the presidents of the Council of the Country and of the provisional government of Bessarabia and by the Soviet of Chișinău. Bessarabia declared independence from Russia on January 24, 1918, and, on April 9, 1918, Sfatul Țării voted union with Romania: of the 148 deputies, 86 voted for union, 3 against, 36 abstained (mostly the deputies representing the minorities, 50% of Bessarabia's population at the time) and 13 were not present.

The union of Bessarabia with Romania was ratified in 1920 by the Treaty of Paris, which however was not recognized by the Russian SFSR and the United States of America (the United States abstaining due to the Treaty of Trianon).

Romania retained Bessarabia from 1918 to 1940, when it accepted a Soviet ultimatum to give up Bessarabia and Northern Bukovina. Most of Bessarabia was made into the Moldavian SSR, while its southern Budjak region was given to the Ukrainian SSR. During World War II, Romania (in alliance with the Axis powers) took back Bessarabia and was awarded further territorial gains at the expense of the Soviet Union (the Transnistria Governorate) as compensation for Northern Transylvania, lost to Hungary in 1940. Nonetheless, the defeat of the Axis in the war resulted in Bessarabia returning to Soviet control and the restoration of previous internal borders. Defeated Romania also became a communist state within the Soviet-led Eastern Bloc.

=== Romanian–Moldovan SSR relations ===
Moldavian SSR–Romania relations
- Moldavian SSR: Romania

In August 1976, Nicolae Ceaușescu, his wife, and his son were the first high-level Romanian visitors to the Moldavian SSR since World War II. The Moldavian CP First Secretary Ivan Bodiul met them at the frontier and escorted them to Chișinău. In December 1976, Bodiul and his wife Claudia arrived for a return visit of five days at Ceaușescu's invitation. Bodiul's visit was a "first" in the history of postwar bilateral relations. At one of his meetings in Bucharest, Bodiul said that "the good relationship was initiated by Ceaușescu's visit to Soviet Moldavia, which led to the expansion of contacts and exchanges in all fields."

On November 5, 1978 the Stânca-Costești Hydroelectrical Plant (at Stânca-Costești) on Prut was inaugurated six years after ratification of the basic Romanian-Soviet agreement on its construction. Romania was represented by Ion Iliescu, while Bodiul represented the USSR.

A visit was paid from 14 to 16 June 1979, to the Moldavian SSR by a Romanian Communist Party delegation headed by Ion Iliescu, Political Executive Committee alternate member and Iași County Party Committee First Secretary.

At the Romanian Communist Party's final conference in November 1989, Ceaușescu raised the issue of Bessarabia yet again, denouncing the Molotov–Ribbentrop Pact of 1939 and implicitly calling for the region's restoration to Romania.

=== Recognition by Romania ===
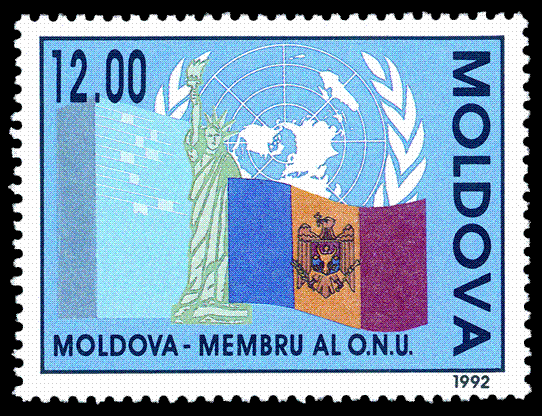
On 27 August 1991, Romania was the first state to recognise Moldova, which became a member of the UN on 2 March 1992

Romania was the first state to recognise the independent Republic of Moldova – only a few hours, in fact, after the Moldovan Declaration of Independence was issued by the Moldovan parliament. From the declaration of the Romanian Government made on that occasion it clearly resulted that, in the opinion of the authorities in Bucharest, Moldova's independence was considered as a form of emancipation from Moscow's tutelage and a step towards the reunification with Romania:

Proclamarea unui stat românesc independent pe teritoriile anexate cu forța în urma înțelegerilor secrete stabilite prin Pactul Molotov–Ribbentrop reprezintă un pas decisiv spre înlăturarea pe cale pașnică a consecințelor nefaste ale acestuia, îndreptate împotriva drepturilor și intereselor poporului român.

[The proclamation of an independent Romanian state in the territories annexed by force following the secret agreements of the Ribbentrop-Molotov Pact represents a decisive step toward the peaceful elimination of this pact's unfortunate consequences directed against the rights and interests of the Romanian people.]

Within a few days agreements were signed for the establishment of diplomatic ties. Within a few weeks, visa and passport-free border regimes were established, allowing Romanian and Moldovan citizens to travel across the border with identity cards only. Already in 1991, Romania started donating books for Moldovan libraries and textbooks for schools and began to offer scholarships to Moldovan students to study in Romanian high schools and universities.

During the War of Transnistria, Romania was the only nation to support Moldova. Transnistria received support from Russia and Ukraine, meaning Moldovan forces were pitted not only against Transnistrian troops but also Russian cossacks and volunteers, as well as Ukrainian volunteers. Romania, however, sent a contingent of volunteers and military advisers to fight alongside Moldovan forces, as well as supplying Moldova with weapons and equipment.

On 14 April 1994, the Romanian Chamber of Deputies adopted a declaration of protest against the decision of the Moldovan Parliament in favour of accession to the CIS. The protest contained serious accusations to the legislative body of the newly established neighbouring country:

Votul Parlamentului de la Chișinău reconfirmă, în mod regretabil, Pactul criminal și anulează iresponsabil un drept al națiunii române de a trăi în integritatea spațiului ei istoric și spiritual ... Prin poziția geografică, cultură, istorie și traditii, locul natural al fraților noștri de peste Prut este, fără îndoială, împreună cu noi, în marea familie a națiunilor europene și nicidecum în cadrul unei structuri euro-asiatice.

[The vote of the Parliament in Chișinău regrettably reconfirms the criminal pact and irresponsibly cancels the right of the Romanian nation to live within the integrity of its historical and spiritual space ... Through the geographical position, culture, history and traditions, the natural place of our brothers from across the Prut is, undoubtedly, together with us, in the great family of the European nations and by no means in a Eurasian structure.]

=== 2001–08 ===
In March 2002, the new Communist president of Moldova, Vladimir Voronin, announced that he was ending Romania's "colonial policy" towards Moldova by seeking a closer relationship with Moscow.

In 2007, tension between the two governments increased in context of a resumption of Romanian program for granting some Moldovan citizens dual citizenship. In February 2007, Voronin declared that 10 million "ethnic Moldovans" were being persecuted in Romania by not being allowed to officially register as an ethnic minority. Voronin's statement was criticized in harsh terms by various Romanian organizations. Romanian newspaper Gândul pointed out that this alleged minority was about half the Romanian population. Constantin Iordachi interpreted Voronin's statement as: "Moreover, blaming Romania’s irredenta policies, Voronin put forward his own plans for a Greater Moldova, raising territorial claims to Romania’s province of Moldova." A month later Voronin declared that the "Moldovan language is the mother of the Romanian language. [...] Attempts to call it Romanian, attempts to call it anything else, are attempts to cheat history and deceive one's own mother." In November, Voronin accused Romania of being "the last empire of Europe".

=== 2009 diplomatic row ===
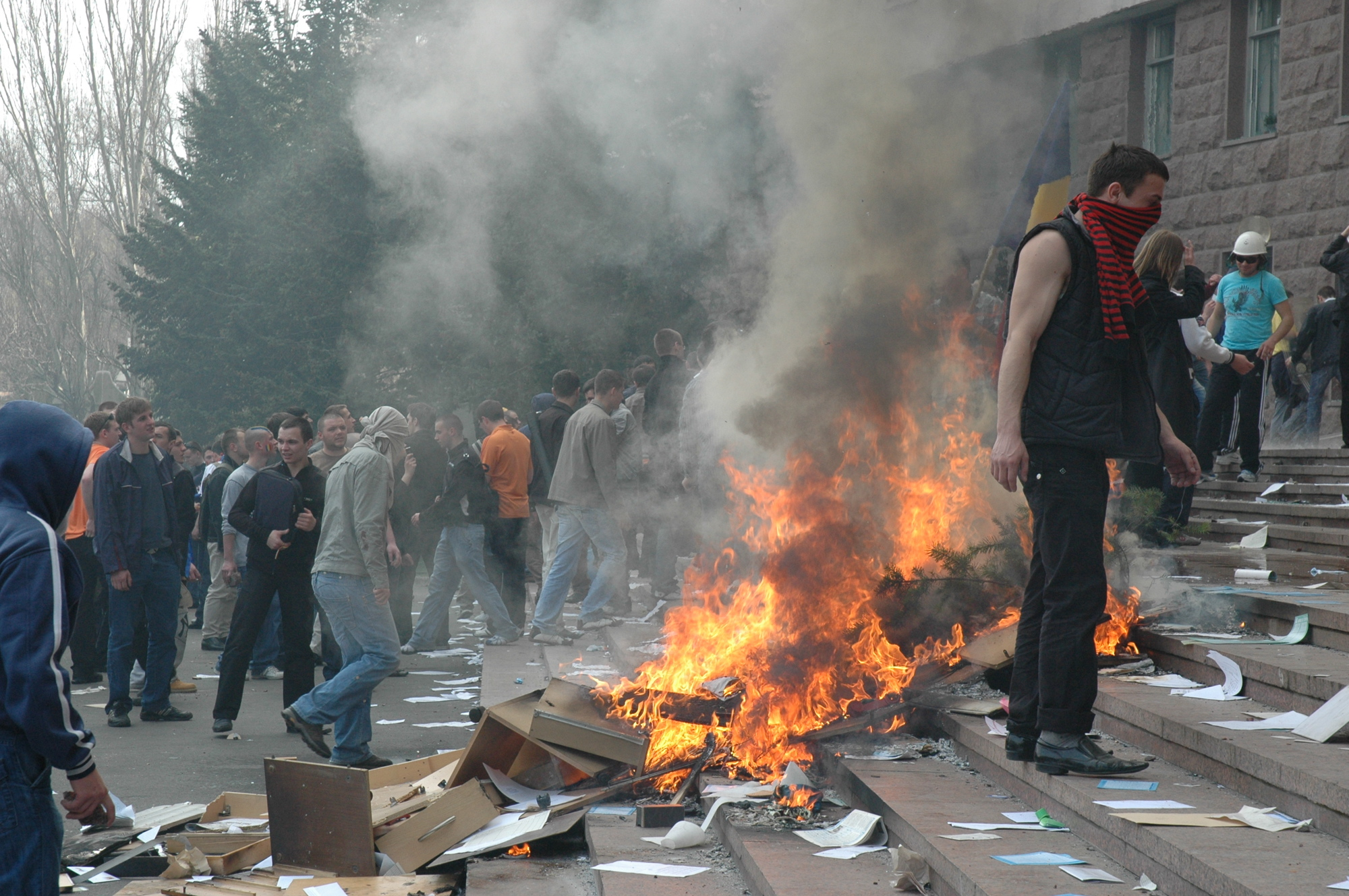
2009 Moldova civil unrest

The civil unrest in Moldova in April 2009 led to a diplomatic row between the countries, after President Voronin accused Romania of being the force behind the riots in Chișinău. Romania denied all charges of being involved in the protests.

The Romanian ambassador in Moldova, Filip Teodorescu was declared persona non grata by the Moldovan government, being required to leave the country within 24 hours. The following day, the Romanian parliament nominated a senior diplomat, Mihnea Constantinescu, as the new ambassador to Moldova, but two weeks later the Moldovan government rejected him without explanation, deepening the crisis.

The Moldovan government instituted visa requirements for Romanian citizens and closed the border between Romania and Moldova on 7 April. Moldovan students studying in Romania and international journalists were not allowed to enter the country. The following day, train connections between Romania and Moldova were cancelled for undefined period, because of "technical" issues. Romania announced that it will not reciprocate on the expelling of the ambassador and it will keep the same visa regime, with visas free-of-charge for Moldovan citizens. It also condemned as "arbitrary and discriminatory" the new measures brought against Romanian nationals in Moldova and has stated that the visa scheme was "reckless" and broke a Moldova-EU pact.

The Romanian government changed the regulations that allow foreigners who had ancestors with Romanian citizenship (including most Moldovans) to gain the Romanian citizenship. The new law allows people with at least a Romanian great-grandparent (instead of just a grandparent as before) to request Romanian citizenship, while it added a maximum term of five months for giving a response to the request.

On 9 February 2010, the Romanian Parliament approved a new ambassador to Moldova, Marius Lazurcă.

Time later, on 20 April 2012, Moldova and Romania signed a Defence Cooperation Agreement. The agreement was expanded on 21 June 2024.

=== Presidency of Igor Dodon ===
Under President Igor Dodon, bilateral relations deteriorated significantly. Throughout his presidency, Dodon never undertook an official visit to the Romanian capital of Bucharest. In March 2018, he announced his belief that Romanians who support the unification of Moldova and Romania as the country's "number one enemy", going further in an interview with Radio Free Europe by saying that the Bucharest government supports any attempt at unionism. Even further, Dodon, was greatly and staunchly against EU membership. Despite this deterioration, Dodon, during a meeting with President Klaus Iohannis in New York City, said that the development of Romanian relations was a "key priority" for his government. In May 2020, during a Facebook fight with Romanian MEP Siegfried Mureșan, Moldovan Prime Minister Ion Chicu declared Romania to be the most corrupt country in Europe. Chicu's words caused controversy in Romania, with a Romanian deputy requesting the withdrawal of Chicu's Romanian citizenship. Chicu would later apologize during a meeting with the Romanian ambassador in Moldova Daniel Ioniță.

=== Presidency of Maia Sandu ===
Moldova under the current presidency of Maia Sandu has reoriented to become much more pro-Romanian and pro-Western, despite Russian pressure.

During the international and national COVID-19 pandemic, she had a meeting with Iohannis at Chișinău on 29 December 2020. On it, Iohannis promised that Romania would donate 200,000 vaccine units to Moldova as part of a collaboration program on matters of the COVID-19 pandemic and other topics between the two countries.

Sandu accelerated the process for Moldova's integration into the EU, and has declared that "the Republic will integrate into the European space with the help of Romania". Moldova formally applied to join the EU in March 2022, after growing concern over Russian expansionism (as seen in Ukraine), and was granted candidate status in June 2022.

Public support in Moldova for union with Romania has significantly risen since Sandu took power, jumping to 42.5% in the last poll in November 2022, compared to only 24% support in 2018. Sandu herself has said that she would vote "yes" in a hypothetical unification referendum.

On 2 March 2023, the Moldovan parliament passed a law affirming that the state language was Romanian and not "Moldovan", clearing up previous ambiguities. The idea was supported by the ruling Party of Action and Solidarity and was strongly opposed by the Bloc of Communists and Socialists. The Academy of Sciences of Moldova also supported this decision.

== Unification movement ==
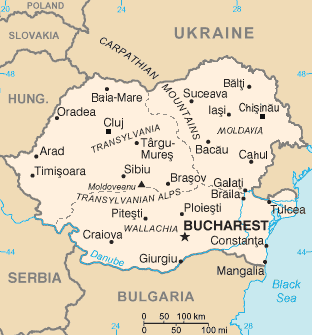
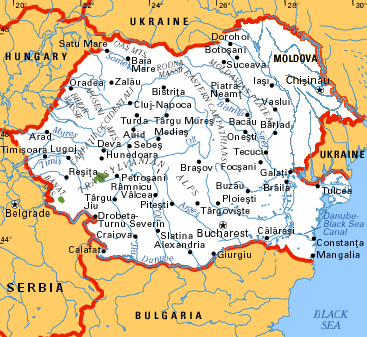
Left image: A map showing the potential union of Romania and Moldova.
Right image: A union between both countries excluding Transnistria.

A movement for the unification of Moldova and Romania began in both countries after the Romanian Revolution and the glasnost policy in the Soviet Union, advocating the peaceful integration of the two states. Individuals supporting the movement are called "Unioniști" (Unionists). In Moldova, those against the movement are called "Moldoveniști" (Moldovenists). Unionist organizations in Romanian and in Moldovan civil society include "Noii Golani" (The New Hooligans) or "Deșteptarea" (The Awakening).

When the Ribbentrop-Molotov Pact was signed, the territories between the Prut and the Dniester belonged to Romania. Since the recognition of the independence of the Republic of Moldova many references were made in Romania to the necessity of eliminating the consequences of the Ribbentrop-Molotov Pact. In June 1991, Romania's Parliament adopted a declaration through which the above-mentioned Pact was declared null and void.

In the aftermath of the 2009 Chișinău riots, director of the Moscow Institute for National Strategy Stanislav Belkovsky reaffirmed his support for the movement, declaring he believes the civil unrest to be a prelude of a political union between the countries. Belkovsky had already authored another plan for the unification between Romania and Moldova, notably excluding Transnistria, which would either become an independent republic or, if it is unviable on its own, unite with Ukraine.

On 29 November 2013, Georgia and Moldova signed the association agreements with the European Union at a summit in Vilnius dedicated to the EU's Eastern Partnership countries. In this context, the Romanian President Traian Băsescu stated that Romania's next project of national importance is the reunification of the two countries, reunification demanded on the streets of Bucharest, Chișinău and Bălți by tens of thousands of people. More than three quarters of Romanian citizens support an eventual union with Moldova, according to an opinion poll conducted by IRES in November 2013. A press release from the pro-union organization Action 2012 claimed that a poll conducted in Moldova, excluding Transnistria and Gagauzia, before the annexation of Crimea by Russia in February 2014 revealed that 52% of Moldovan citizens supported a union with Romania.

In 2017, the Day of the Union of Bessarabia with Romania commemorating the union between both on 27 March was officially promulgated in Romania. Eugen Tomac, then deputy of the People's Movement Party (PMP) and main person behind this project, declared that "forgetting history is the same as betrayal". Although it is not officially recognised in Moldova despite attempts to make it so, unionists in Moldova and Transnistria celebrate it regardless.

In 2018, celebrating the centenary of the Great Union (the unification of Romania with Bessarabia, Bukovina and Transylvania), a demonstration called the Centenary March was organized by several Romanian and Moldovan activists for unification. It started in Alba Iulia on 1 July 2018 and ended in Chișinău on 1 September 2018. One of its main objectives was to achieve the unification of Moldova with Romania. The participants tried to collect 1 million signatures for the organization of a referendum. Although at first the Moldovan authorities prohibited the participants to cross the border, they were allowed to enter later.

== Dual citizenship ==
A 2013 study by the Soros Foundation found that from the passing of the Romanian citizenship law in 1991 until the end of 2012, the number of successful applications from Moldova was 323,049. This is an increase of 96,542 successful applications since 15 August 2011. In the same period, the number of applications was 449,783, meaning that around 125,000 applications still need to be finalised. In 2011 and 2012, 100,845 and 87,015 applications were submitted respectively.

The actual number of persons granted citizenship in these applications remains unclear because each application may include minors dependent on the adult filing. The number of persons is estimated to be around 400,000, with a potential of 150,000 more persons if all outstanding applications are successful.

In 2001, the EU pressured Romania to require an international passport for all Moldovan travelers. Immediately thereafter, a substantial number of Moldovans began to apply for Romanian citizenship. Unofficial data from 2001 suggested that about 200,000 Moldovans also held Romanian citizenship, despite the fact that dual citizenship was officially illegal in Moldova at the time. Due to the overwhelming number of applications, the Romanian embassy imposed a moratorium in 2002. Dual citizenship became an election issue during the 2003 local elections in Moldova. In November that year, the Moldovan parliament passed a law which allowed dual citizenship; this applied to other countries besides Romania, particularly Russia and Ukraine.

Between 1991 and 2006, 95,000 Moldovans have obtained Romanian citizenship. In September 2007, Romania resumed its policy of granting (or restoring as it says) Romanian citizenship to Moldovans who requested it. In response, the Communist-led Moldovan parliament passed a law (in October 2007) prohibiting anyone holding dual citizenship or residing abroad from holding public office. In 2009, Romania granted 36,000 more citizenships and expects to increase the number up to 10,000 per month. Romanian president Traian Băsescu claimed that over 1 million more have made requests for it, and this high number is seen by some as a result of this identity controversy. The Communist government (2001–2009), a vocal advocate of a distinct Moldovan ethnic group, deemed multiple citizenship a threat to Moldovan statehood.

The Moldavian law limiting the political rights of dual-citizenship holders was challenged to the European Court of Human Rights in the case of Tanase v. Moldova. On 27 April 2010, the Grand Chamber of the ECHR decided the ban was "disproportionate with the government’s purpose of ensuring loyalty" of its public servants and members of parliament.

One applicant interviewed by Der Spiegel said: "I want to go further West with this passport. I don't care about Romania." The EU Observer wrote "Many Moldovans regard the Romanian passport as the key to the EU, according to Marian Gherman, a Bucharest prosecutor whose office has investigated a network of touts and bureaucrats who were expediting citizenship applications for money. “Everybody knows it,” he said. “They ask for Romanian citizenship only because it gives them the freedom to travel and work within the EU.” An official from the National Citizenship Authority, NCA, in Bucharest, speaking on condition of anonymity, confirmed that Moldovans had shown little interest in acquiring Romanian nationality until 2007."

== Gallery ==
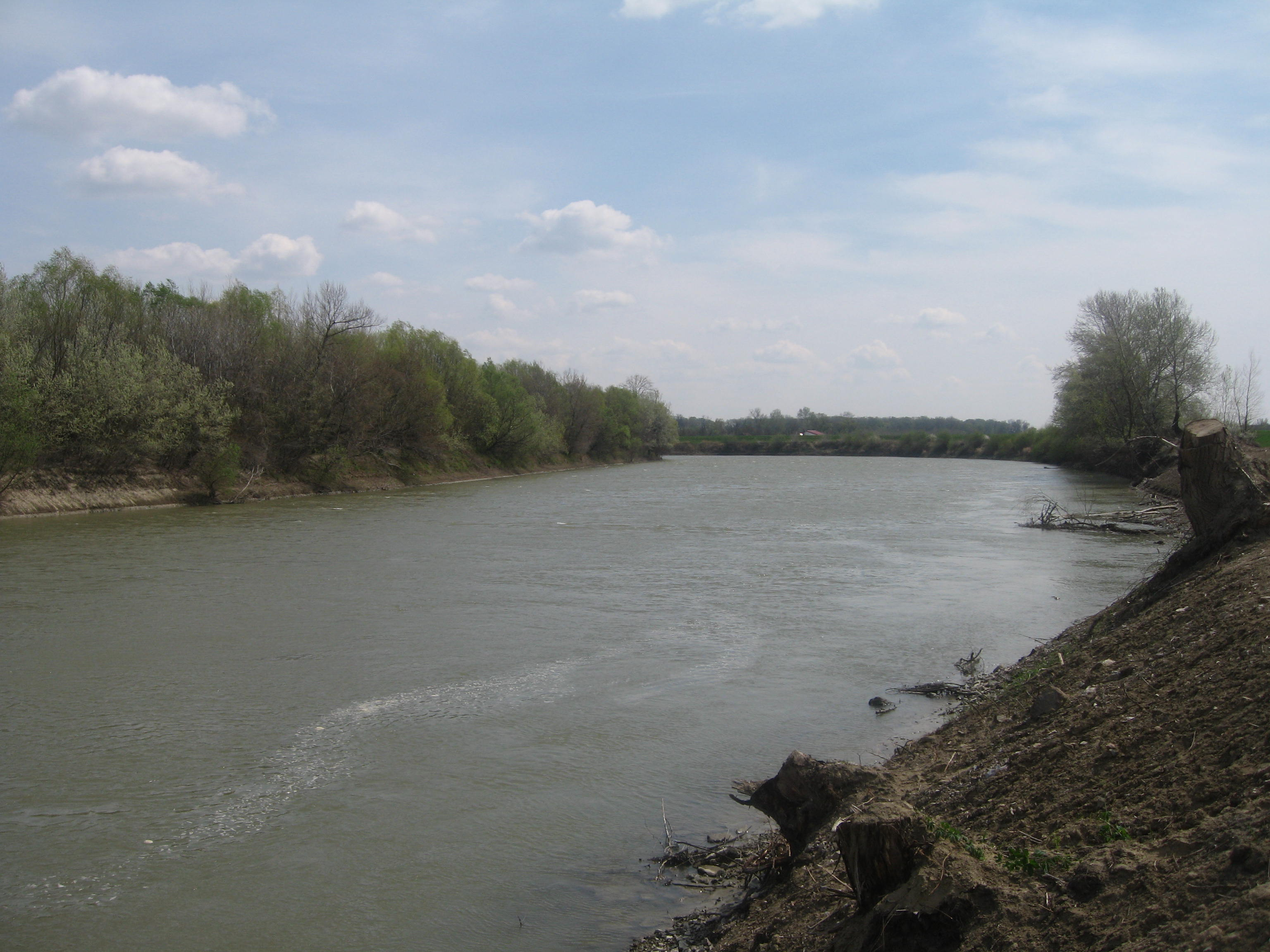
Prut near Albița. The Prut River is the natural border between Romania and Moldova.

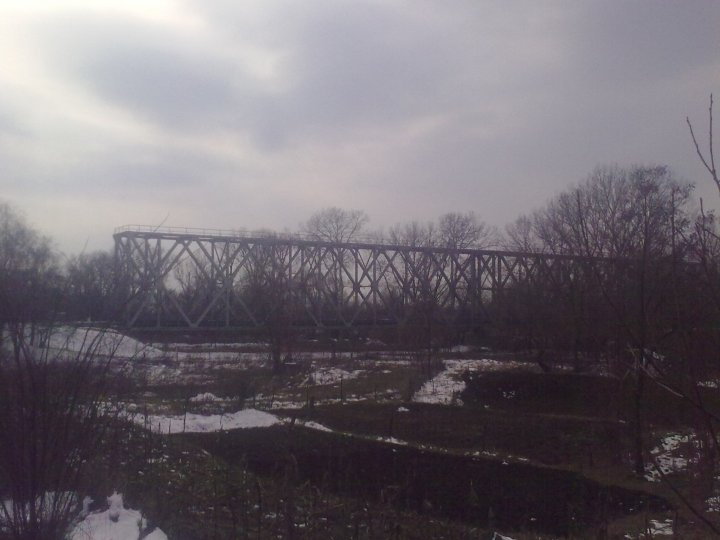
Eiffel Bridge, Ungheni, built in 1877, is the only rail crossing between Romania and Moldova.

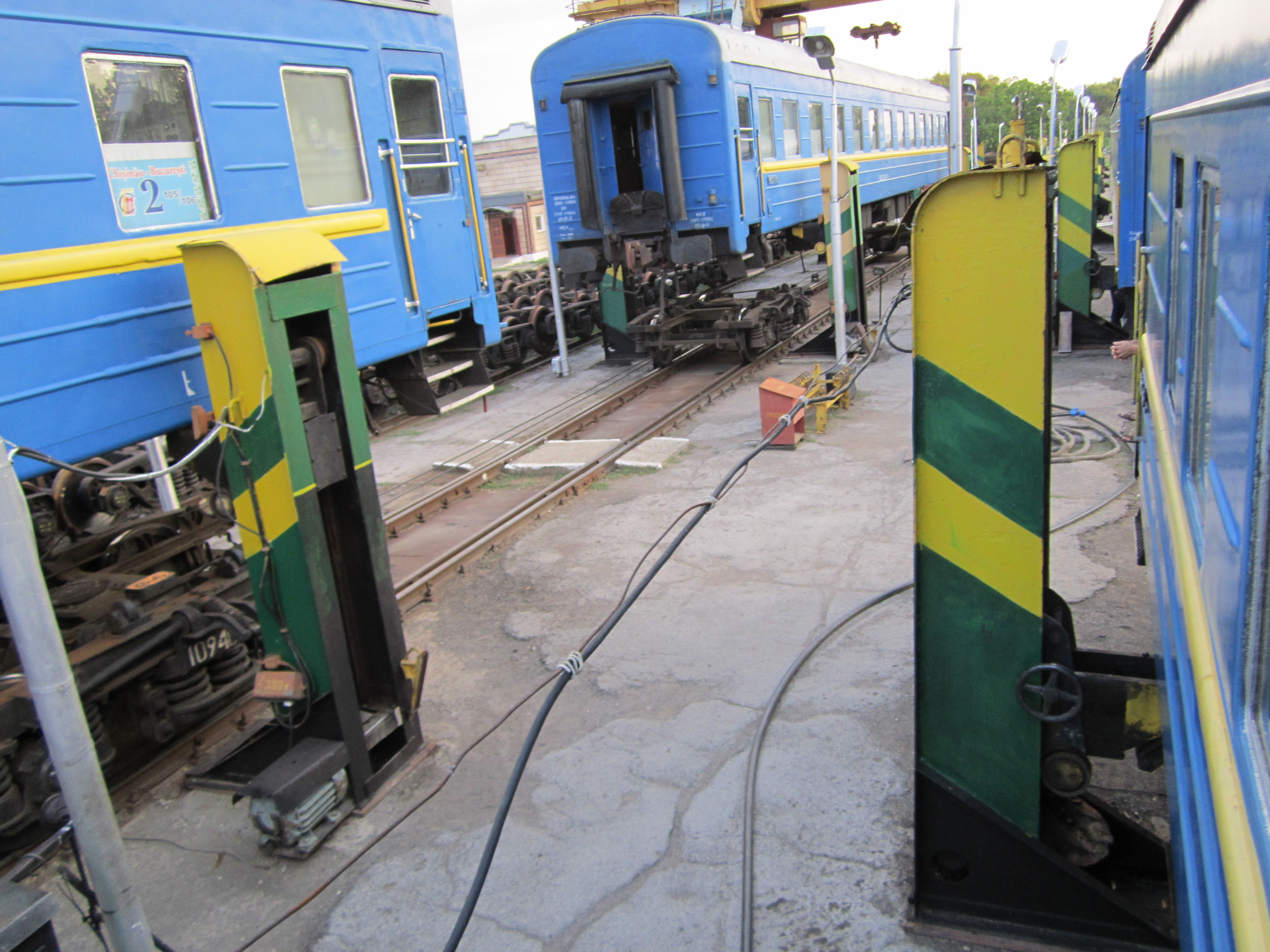
Moldova has 1520 mm rail gauge, while Romania has standard gauge.

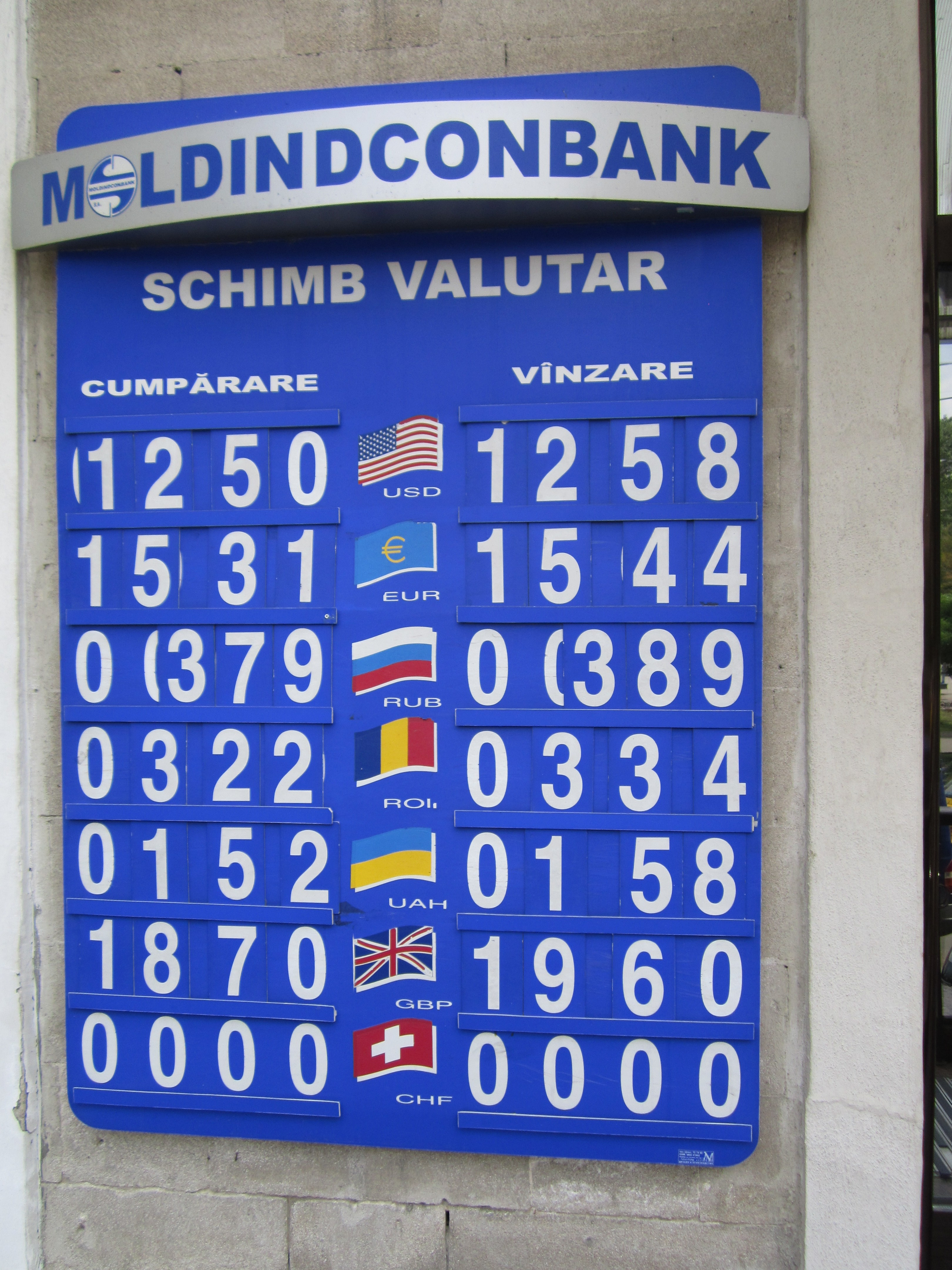
Romanian leu can be conveniently exchanged throughout Moldova.

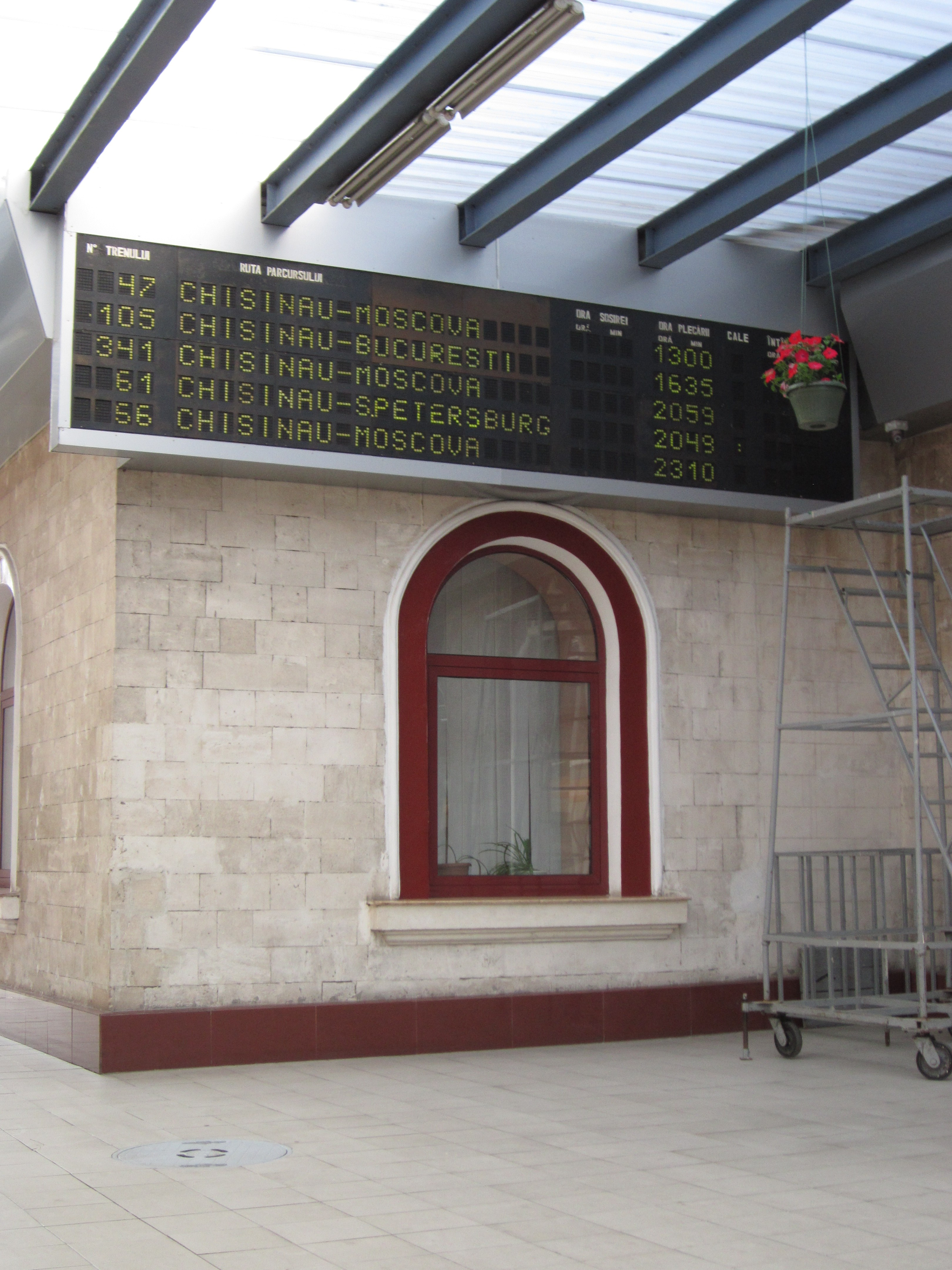
Chișinău railway station timetable showing four departures to Russia and one departure to Romania.

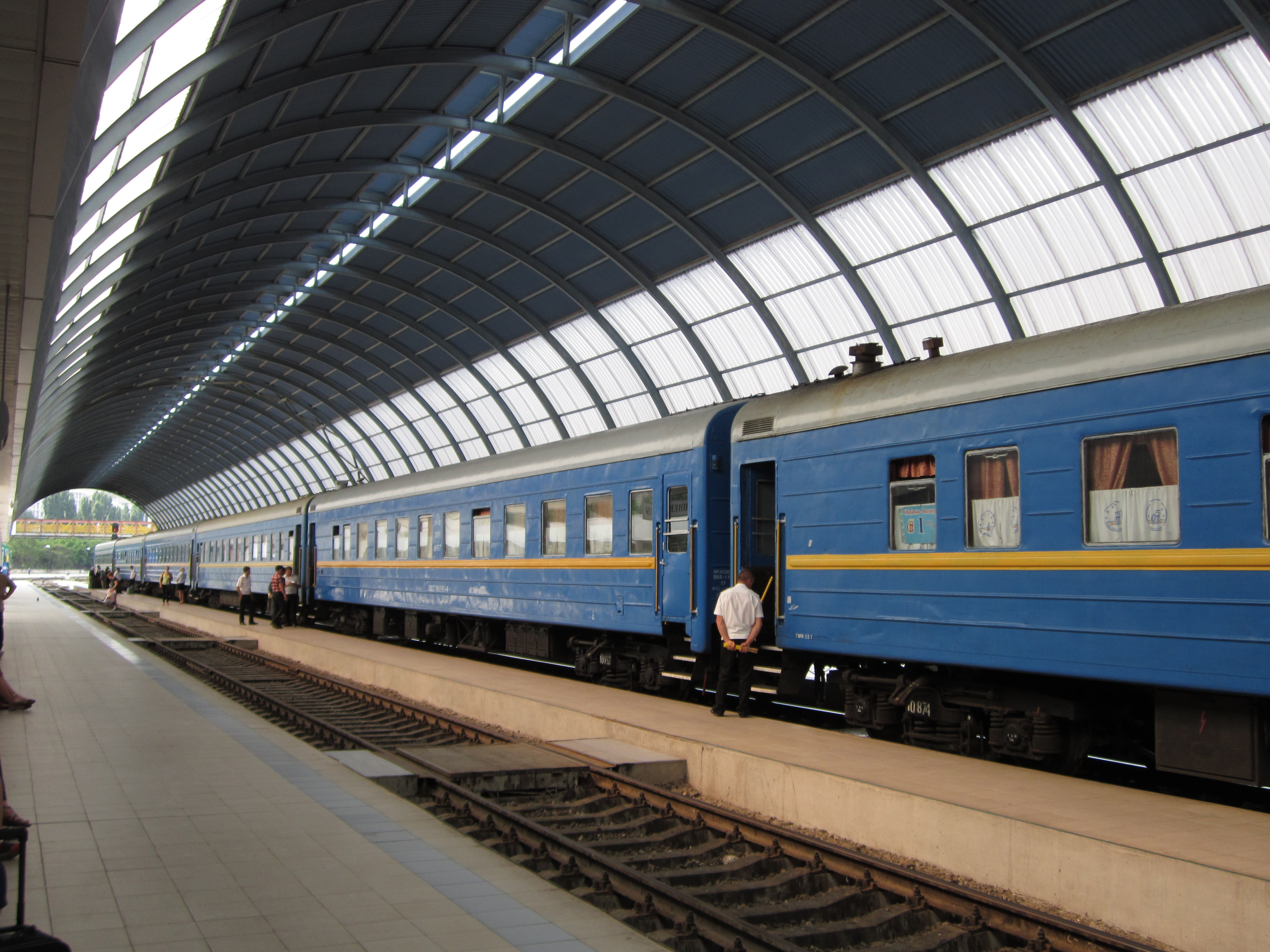
Chișinău–Bucharest daily train called "Friendship" (Prietenia).

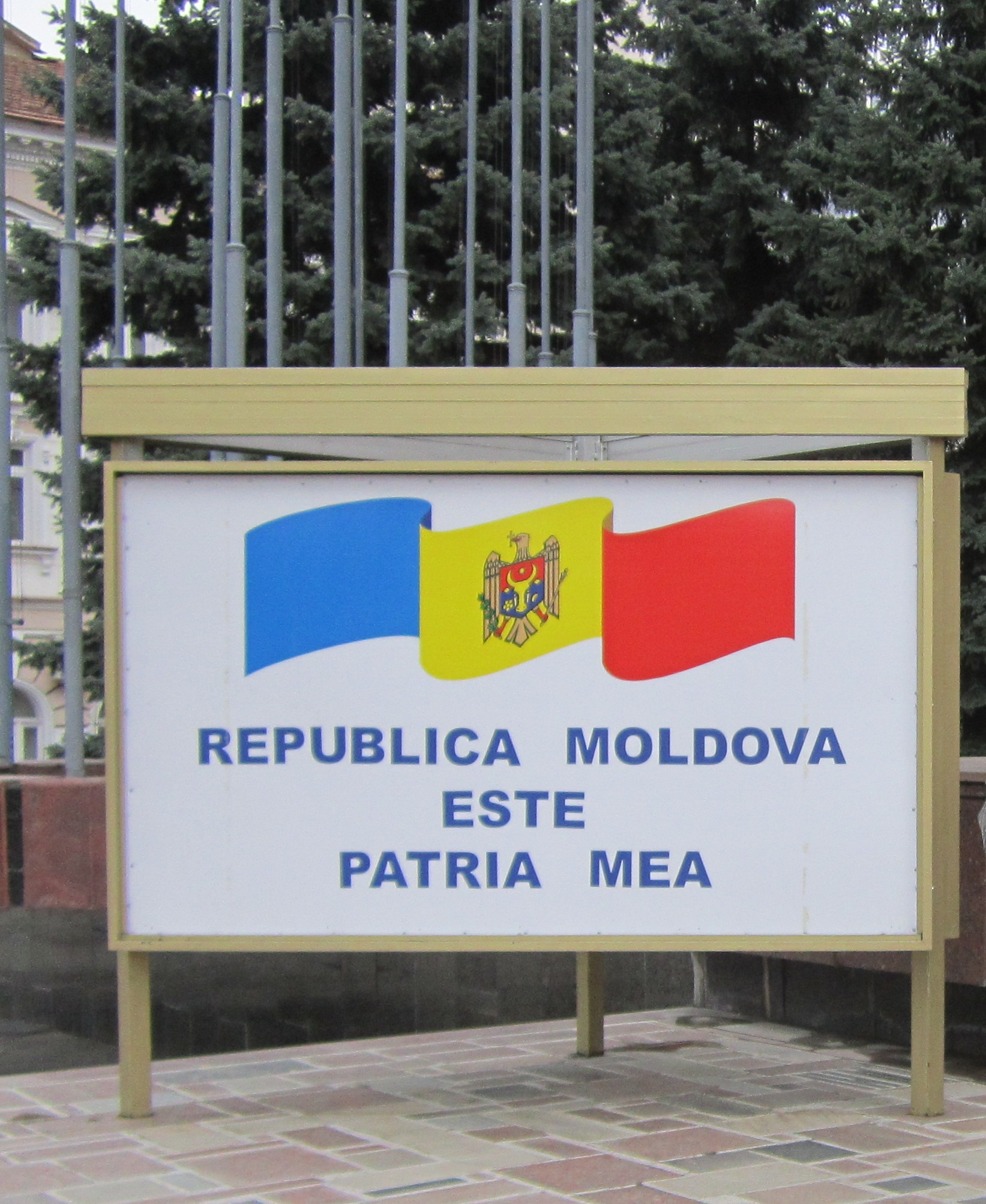
Patriotic poster in Chișinău: "Republic of Moldova is my homeland".

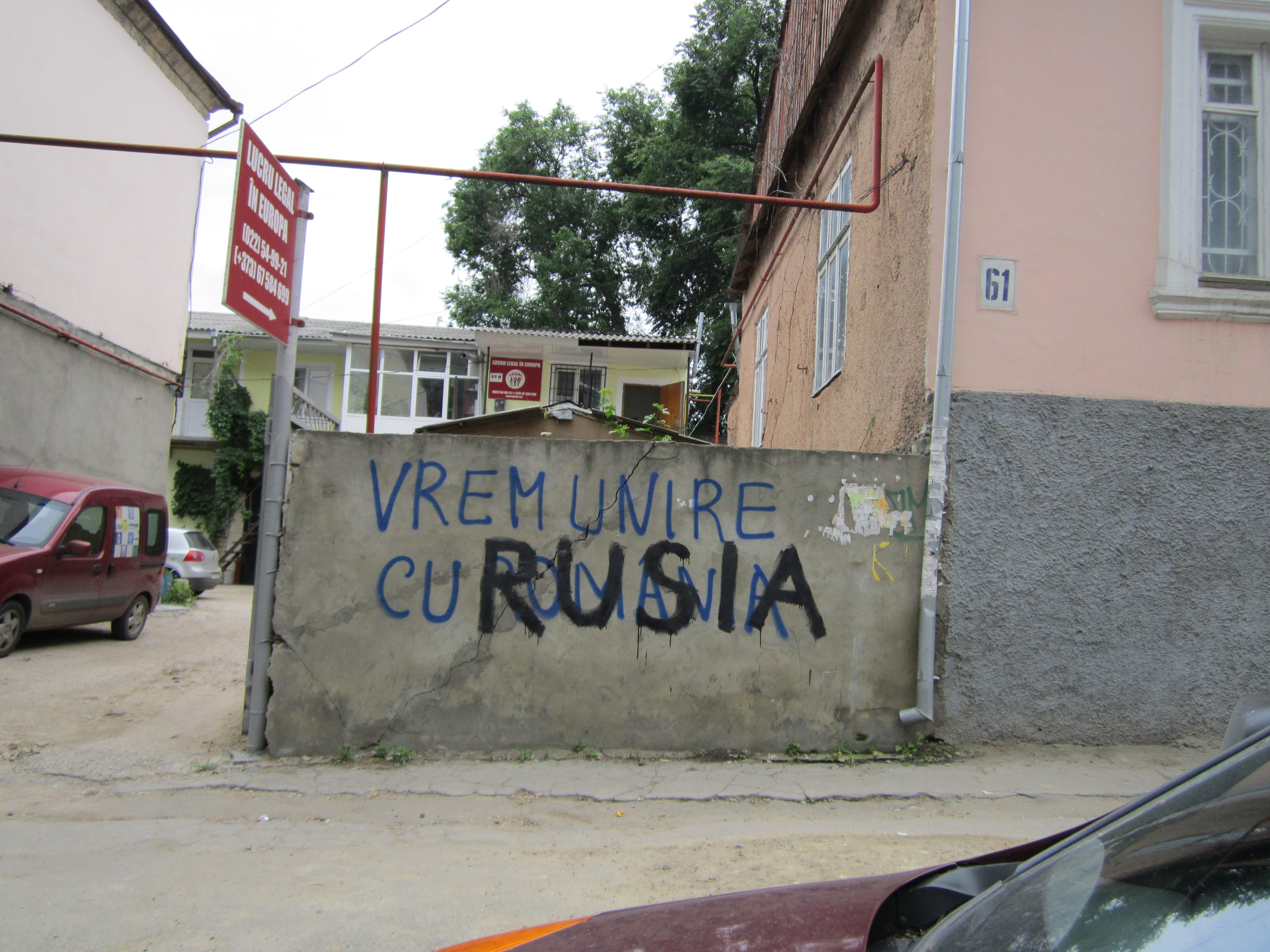
Graffiti in Chișinău. The original reads "We want union with Romania", but "Romania" was later painted over with "Russia".

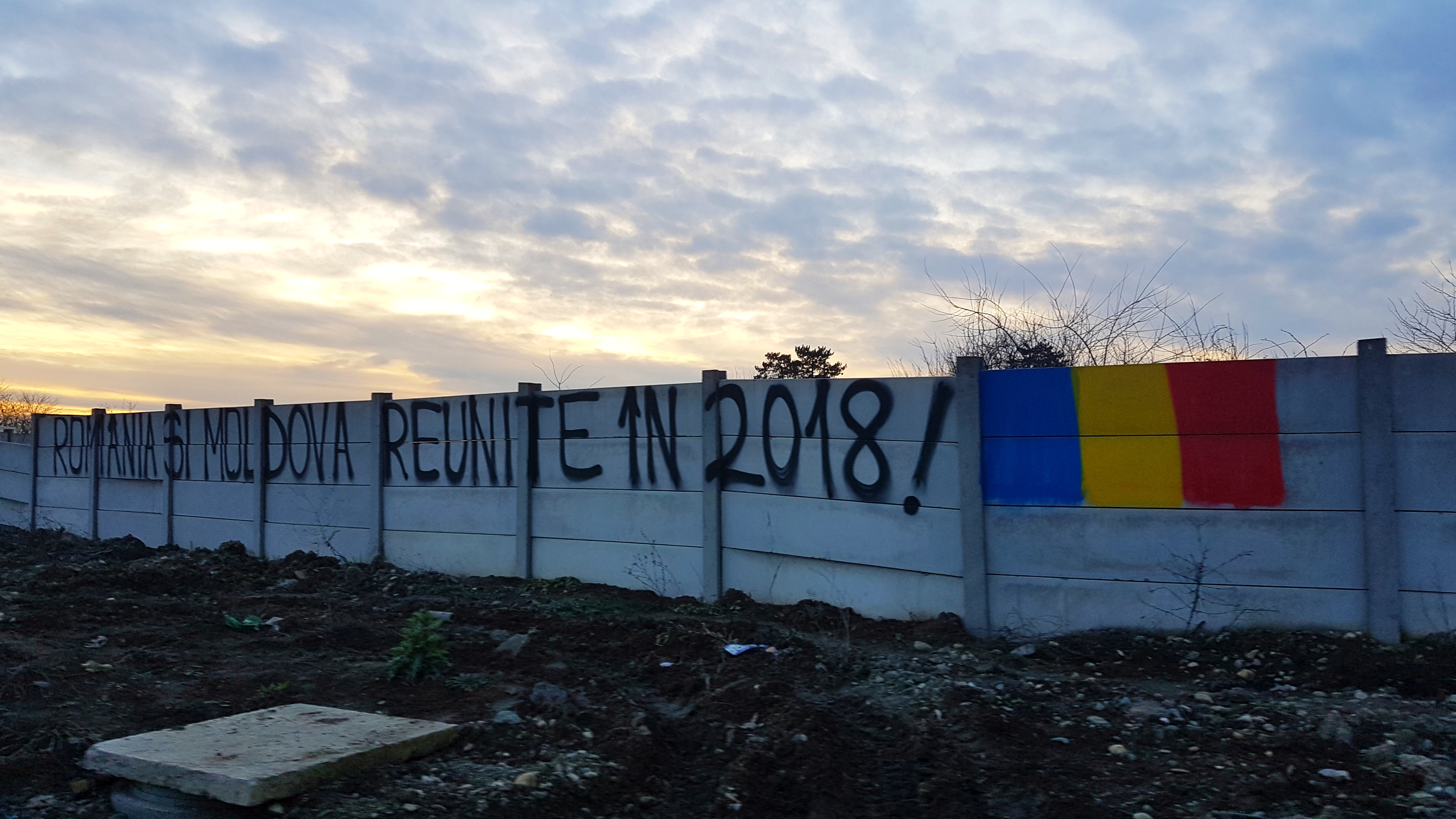
Graffiti in Bucharest. "Romania and Moldova reunited in 2018!".

== See also ==
- Fire Shield
- Foreign relations of Moldova
- Foreign relations of Romania
- Iași–Chișinău pipeline
- Moldova–Romania border
- Unification of Moldova and Romania
- Moldovans in Romania
- Romanians in Moldova
- Citizenship in Romania
- Controversy over national identity in Moldova
- Moldovan Embassy, Bucharest
- Embassy of Romania, Chișinău
- 2018 unification declarations in Moldova and Romania
- Moldovan–Romanian collaboration during the COVID-19 pandemic
- Moldova–European Union relations
- Accession of Moldova to the European Union
- Odesa Triangle
