= Marius Lazurca =

Romanian diplomat

Marius Gabriel Lazurca
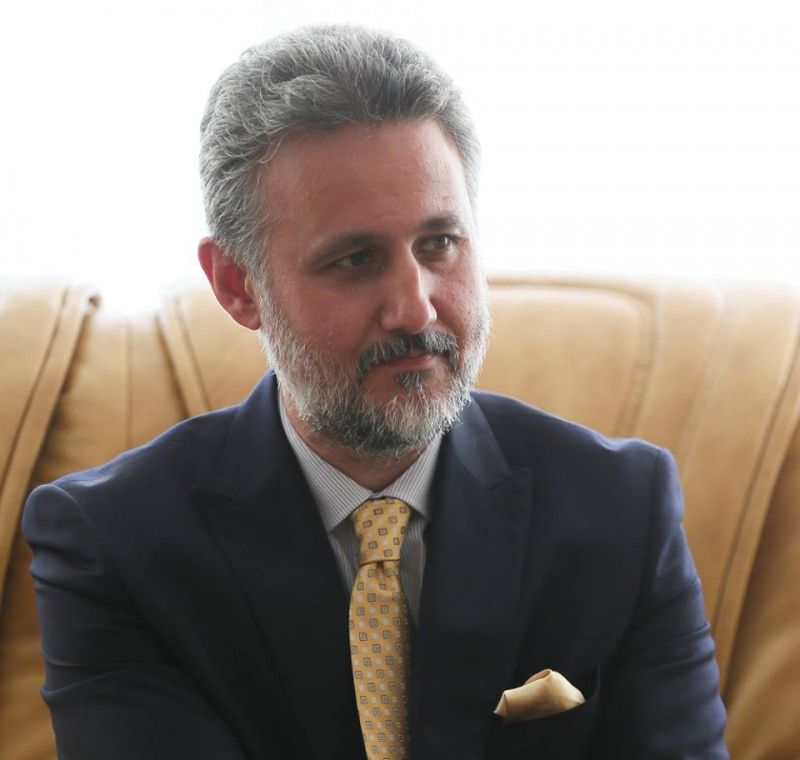

Ambassador to: The Holly See and The Sovereign Military Order of Malta (2006-2010); Republic of Moldova (2010-2016); Hungary (2016-2020); Mexico and Central America (since 2021)

Personal details
- Born: March 15, 1971 (age 55) Timișoara
- Spouse: Dr. Mirela-Dorina Lazurca
- Children: 6 (Vladimir, Olga, Matei, Toma, Theodora, Sebastian)
- Profession: Diplomat, researcher, author

Marius-Gabriel Lazurca (born March 15, 1971, Timișoara, Romania) is a career diplomat, public intellectual, and Romanian author. His work encompasses international relations, comparative literature, historical anthropology, and essay writing. Lazurca's academic background includes studies in Literature at the West University of Timișoara, where he earned a degree in Romanian and French language and literature in 1996. He pursued further degrees at Paris IV-Sorbonne University, obtaining undergraduate (in Comparative Literature), master's, and doctoral degrees (in History-Antropology). His diplomatic career includes ambassadorial roles for Romania to the Holy See (2006-2010), the Republic of Moldova (2010-2016), Hungary (2016-2020), and Mexico (since 2021). Concurrently with his diplomatic responsibilities, Lazurca has maintained an active intellectual presence through published works praised by critics for their analytical depth and meticulous research.

== Biography and education ==
Born on March 15, 1971, in Timișoara, Lazurca completed his primary, secondary, and high school education in Timișoara, Bistrița, and Arad. In 1990, he was admitted to the French-Romanian section of the Faculty of Letters at the University of Timișoara, graduating in 1996. In 1993, following a national competition, he was selected to participate as a foreign student at the École Normale Supérieure in Paris. This program was developed by Professors Étienne Guyon, Violette Rey (an honorary member of the Romanian Academy), and Christian Duhamel.

In Paris, he pursued a bachelor's degree in Comparative Literature at Sorbonne University Paris-IV under Professor Pierre Brunel, defending a thesis on Mircea Eliade in 1994. In 1995, Lazurca completed his Master's thesis in History-Anthropology at the same university, supervised by Professor Michel Meslin. In 2003, also at Sorbonne University Paris-IV, Lazurca defended his doctoral thesis, "L'anthropologie du corps dans le monde romain sous le Haut-Empire" (The Anthropology of the Body in the Roman World under the Early Empire), under the supervision of Michel Meslin.

Lazurca has published books, academic studies, essays, and translations. He has also delivered conferences and lectures in Romanian, French, English, Italian, and Spanish.

Since 1992, he has been married to Mirela-Dorina Lazurca, a physician specializing in acupuncture. They have six children: Vladimir (b. 1995, Paris), Olga (b. 1997, Timișoara), Matei (b. 1999, Timișoara), Toma (b. 2002, Timișoara), Theodora (b. 2006, Arad), and Sebastian (b. 2010, Rome).

== Professional career ==
Lazurca's professional career began in academia, where he served as a teaching-assistant and then a lecturer at the West University of Timișoara's Department of Romance Languages from October 1997 to November 2001. Subsequently, he held a role in cultural management as the Director of the Arad County Cultural Center from December 2001 to December 2006. In this position, his responsibilities included developing Arad County's cultural strategy and establishing a competitive system for public funding of cultural events.

His diplomatic career commenced with his appointment as Ambassador of Romania to the Holy See and the Sovereign Military Order of Malta, a position he held from December 2006 to March 2010. He then served as Ambassador of Romania to the Republic of Moldova from March 2010 to April 2016. From July 2016 to December 2020, he was Ambassador of Romania to Hungary. During his mandate in Hungary, he concurrently served as the Permanent Representative of Romania to the Danube Commission in Budapest from July 2016 to December 2020.

Since February 2021, Lazurca has served as Ambassador of Romania to Mexico and Central America.

== Publishing and academic activity ==
Lazurca's publishing activities began during his student years, with contributions to the Orizont magazine of the Timișoara Writers' Union. He has published original volumes, academic studies, essays, and translations across fields such as comparative literature. historical anthropology, philosophy, and international relations.

His published books include The Invention of the Body (in Romanian, 1996), The Hidden God. Literature and Initiation in Mircea Eliade's Work (in Romanian, 2001; 2nd edition, 2015). He also authored Arad County Cultural Strategy/Arad County Cultural Strategy (in Romanian and English, 2005). In 2022, his work In corpore. From the Pagan Body to the Christian Body in Late Antiquity was published in Romanian

Starting in 1997, Lazurca joined the "A Treia Europă" ("The Third Europe") research group, at the invitation of Professors Adriana Babeți, Mircea Mihăieș, and Cornel Ungureanu. This group has published an academic journal, anthologies, research volumes, and a series of Central-European novels, primarily through Polirom Publishing House. Within this group, Lazurca contributed comparative literature studies and wrote prefaces/postfaces for novels by Central European authors such as Joseph Roth (Radetzky March and The Crypt of the Capuchins, Univers, 1998) and Czesław Miłosz (The Issa Valley, Univers, 2000).

Lazurca is also a contributor to the Dictionary of the Central-European Novel of the XXth Century, edited and coordinated by Adriana Babeți (in Romanian, 2022). Additionally, he has translated several volumes, including Emmanuel Lévinas's Totalité et Infini (into Romanian, 1999). Since 1996, he has published and delivered conferences on various subjects, including French and Central European literature, the history of ideas, and international relations, presented in Romanian, French, English, Spanish, and Italian. This scientific and publishing activity, alongside his diplomatic career, prompted Andrei Pleșu to write, on the back cover of the volume In corpore. From the Pagan Body to the Christian Body in Late Antiquity: "I am always delighted when I meet an intellectual whom public dignities do not divert from his scholarly vocation. Unfortunately, the phenomenon is rare. Taking on a high administrative career is difficult to reconcile with the reflexes of studious 'contemplation'. Marius Lazurca is, however, a happy exception."

In a collaborative effort with Vladimir Lazurca, Marius Lazurca has co-edited the works of David Mitrany. The first two volumes, The Functional Theory of Politics and A Working Peace System, were released in 2023 by Presa Universitară Clujeană. Lazurca also wrote the prefaces for both volumes. This editorial project was initiated by Professor Paul-Dragoș Aligică and receives financial support from Banca Comercială Română and the Spandugino Foundation.

== Awards ==
Lazurca has received several decorations and orders, primarily associated with his ambassadorial posts.

Distinctions include:

- The Grand Cross of the Order of Pius IX, awarded by the Holy See.
- The Grand Cross of the Order "Pro Merito Melitensi", bestowed by the Sovereign Military Order of Malta.
- The Order of Honor of the Republic of Moldova, presented at the conclusion of his ambassadorial mandate in Chișinău.

For his publishing, Lazurca received: the Debut Prize of the Timișoara Writers' Union in 1997; the "Ovidiu Cotruș" Prize for Literary Criticism and Essay in 1999; and the "Observatorul Cultural" magazine Prize in 2023.

In 2011, Lazurca received the Nicolae Titulescu Award, a distinction awarded by the Romanian Academy and the Grand National Lodge of Romania.

During the 2014 Annual Meeting of Romanian Diplomacy, Foreign Minister Titus Corlățean presented Ambassador Lazurca with the Ministry of Foreign Affairs' Diploma of Excellence.

== Professional affiliations ==
Lazurca is a member of Romania's diplomatic and consular corps.

He is also an alumnus of:

- École Normale Supérieure, Paris.
- "New Europe College", Bucharest

== Language proficiency ==
In addition to his native Romanian, Lazurca is fluent in French, English, Spanish, and Italian. During his tenure as ambassador in Budapest, Lazurca studied Hungarian.

== See also ==
- Embassy of Romania, Chișinău
- Moldova–Romania relations
