= Atlas Network =

Free market American think tank support group

Coordinates: 38.9038°N 77.0285°W

- Other name: Atlas Economic Research Foundation
- Founder: Antony Fisher
- Established: 1981; 45 years ago
- Chair: Montgomery Brown
- Chief executive officer: Brad Lips
- Budget: Revenue: $24.3 million Expenses: $25 million (2024)
- Members: 581 (2024)
- Location: Arlington County, Virginia, U.S.
- Website: www.atlasnetwork.org

Atlas Network, legal name Atlas Economic Research Foundation, is a non-governmental 501(c)(3) organization based in the United States that provides training, networking, and grants for libertarian, free-market, and conservative groups around the world. Atlas Network was founded in 1981 by Antony Fisher, a British entrepreneur, who wanted to connect various think tanks via a global network. Described as "a think tank that creates think tanks", the organization partners with nearly 600 organizations in over 100 countries.

== History ==
=== Background and founding ===
Atlas Network was founded in 1981 in San Francisco as the Atlas Economic Research Foundation by Antony Fisher, a British entrepreneur who was influenced by Austrian School economist F.A. Hayek and his 1944 book The Road to Serfdom. After founding the Institute of Economic Affairs in London in 1955, Fisher had helped establish the Fraser Institute, the International Center for Economic Policy Studies (later renamed the Manhattan Institute for Policy Research), and the Pacific Research Institute for Public Policy in the 1970s. The late Linda Whetstone, Fisher's daughter, served as chairman of Atlas Network.

F.A. Hayek, Margaret Thatcher, and Milton Friedman, all friends of Fisher, formally endorsed the organization. Atlas Network connected various think tanks via a global network, and was part of a transatlantic network including academics, journalists, and businesspeople who supported and promoted like-minded ideologies. In the words of professor Richard Meagher, it was founded as a "think tank that creates think tanks."

=== Early years, expansion, and influence ===
Fisher conceived Atlas Network as a means to connect various think tanks via a global network through which the organizations could learn best practices from one another and "pass the best research and policy ideas from one to the other". Initially comprising only Fisher's think tanks, Atlas Network grew to include many others, including those affiliated with the Koch family.

Atlas Network says that the organization is not named after Ayn Rand's novel Atlas Shrugged. Atlas Network has received funding from American and European businesses and think tanks to coordinate and organize libertarian organizations in the developing world. In 1981, Atlas Network helped economist Hernando de Soto found the Institute for Liberty and Democracy (ILD) in Peru, and also invested in the Institut Economique de Paris (IEP) in France. In 1983, Fisher helped launch the National Center for Policy Analysis (NCPA) in Dallas, Texas, and the Jon Thorlaksson Institute in Iceland (now replaced by the Icelandic Research Centre for Innovation and Economic Growth). Atlas Network helped establish the Hong Kong Centre for Economic Research in 1987 and the Liberty Institute in New Delhi in 1996. Atlas Network grew from 15 think tanks in nine countries in the mid-1980s to 457 think tanks in 96 countries as of 2020.

The 2019 and 2020 Global Go To Think Tank Index Report ranked Atlas Network as 54th among the "Top Think Tanks in the United States". Atlas Network's think tank partners "produce white papers, meet with politicos, liaise with the media, write legislation, and much more", as described by WNYC. In 2018, academic Karin Fischer described Atlas Network campaigns for deregulation and property rights as having so much influence that the World Bank's Doing Business Index "follows exactly Atlas' policy recommendations".

Atlas Network has promoted entrepreneurship in Africa and other parts of the world, including what it calls "freedom-oriented idea entrepreneurs." Atlas Network also promotes "classically liberal policies and ideas."

=== Tobacco and oil industry links ===
Atlas Network has been linked to the tobacco industry; The Guardian calculated that more than one-fifth of Atlas Network partners worldwide had either opposed tobacco controls or taken tobacco donations. A 2017 paper in the International Journal of Health Planning and Management said that Atlas Network "channeled funding from tobacco corporations to think tank actors to produce publications supportive of industry positions." The University of Bath's Tobacco Control Research Group said Atlas Network "appears to have played a particular role in helping the tobacco industry oppose tobacco control measures in Latin America" during the 1990s.

Atlas Network and its partners, such as the Canadian Taxpayers Federation, Cato Institute, and Fraser Institute, have been linked to oil and gas producers, as well as efforts opposing governments' and activists' efforts against climate change. According to documents described in The Guardian, Atlas Network collaborated with Canada's Macdonald–Laurier Institute in a push for oil and gas development on Indigenous land. Atlas Network told The New Republic that it has "no partnerships with extractive industries such as oil and gas companies, we receive no funding from oil and gas companies and have not received funding from oil and gas companies for nearly 15 years." In April 2025, Atlas Network again denied receiving any funding from "extractive industries."

=== Political ties ===
Atlas Network describes itself as non-partisan and does not get involved in campaigns or elections, but rather trains local think tanks on how to influence the public and policymakers. According to ABC News Australia, Atlas Network partners are "taught how to win the battle for hearts and minds."

The Intercept, The Guardian, and The New Republic have described Atlas Network as having ties to conservative movements, including the administration of Donald Trump in the United States, Brexit in the United Kingdom, and anti-government protests in Latin America. A 2024 study analyzing 52 Atlas Network partners found that "while some Atlas-affiliated partners show readiness to confront the threat of nationalist and authoritarian societal mobilization, others conceive it as a tactical or strategic opportunity to advance free market causes."

Atlas Network partners were linked to an online campaign that used fake accounts against the Cuban government during the 2021 Cuban protests. Atlas Network sponsored the 2023 Latin America Liberty Forum in Brazil, where Luiz Inácio Lula da Silva's policies were opposed.

Atlas Network partners opposed the 2022 Russian invasion of Ukraine. Atlas Network worked with its partners to create the Ukraine Freedom Fund, acquiring, transporting, and providing goods to Ukrainians, and supporting Atlas Network partner groups in the country. The Washington Examiner reported that the humanitarian aid totaled $3.5 million by December 2022. According to Reason, a libertarian magazine, Atlas Network supports nonprofit organizations that fight against authoritarianism and support free markets, self-determination, and rule of law.

According to University of Technology Sydney political scientist Jeremy Walker, the conservative lobby group, Advance collaborated with fossil fuel companies and Atlas Network affiliates the Centre for Independent Studies, Institute of Public Affairs, and LibertyWorks to promote the No campaign in the 2023 Australian Indigenous Voice referendum.

== Leadership ==
The chief executive officer of Atlas Network is Brad Lips. Lips joined Atlas Network, then known as the Atlas Economic Research Foundation, in 1998, and became CEO in 2009. He is the author of Liberalism and the Free Society in 2021. He stated that he advocates for a "freedom philosophy", and quoting Friedman, has summarized Atlas Network's function as "to develop alternatives to existing policies, to keep them alive until the politically impossible becomes the politically inevitable." In an opinion article in The Chronicle of Philanthropy, Lips argued for funding market-oriented nonprofit groups instead of increasing traditional foreign aid. He said that Atlas Network is nonpartisan and "willing to talk to all parties".

Tom Palmer serves as executive vice president for international programs. Palmer co-authored the book Development with Dignity: Self-Determination, Localization, and the End of Poverty. Palmer, known in American libertarian circles since the 1970s, has promoted economic libertarian efforts in various countries including Communist and post-Communist Eastern Europe, as well as Iraq and Afghanistan; after the 2022 Russian invasion, he traveled inside Ukraine to help coordinate Atlas Network aid. He has spoken out against far-right and far-left authoritarian populist movements in the United States and other countries.

Palmer blames "envy and resentment" for driving collectivist impulses that are authoritarian in nature. He also rejects Atlas Network’s "pro-corporate" label by some critics, saying that, "Being in favor of the market is not the same as being in favor of business."

Only 30 people work specifically for Atlas Network, although more than 1,000 people participate in it via its partner think tanks, according to Global Think Tanks: Policy Networks and Governance, published in 2020. Atlas Network is organized into centers by region. Entrepreneur Magatte Wade is director of the Center for African Prosperity and the historian Ibrahim B. Anoba is a fellow at the center. Wade said in Reason that the solution to Africa's economic problems lies in a "cheetah generation" of young Africans who embrace free markets, individualism, human rights, and transparency in government. In her words, "[Africa is] poor because we don't let our entrepreneurs work." Antonella Marty of Argentina served as a fellow for the Center for Latin America, which publishes the annual Index of Bureaucracy. Atlas Network also runs the Center for United States and Canada and the Center for Asia and Oceania.

== Activities ==
=== Training and networking ===
Atlas Network has been described as a "connector", putting "freedom intellectuals" and local think tanks in contact and financing their trips. The organization offers training, consulting, and professional certification related to fundraising, marketing, organizational leadership, and think tank management through its Atlas Network Academy program. In 2020, Atlas Network trained nearly 4,000 people in promoting free-market voices, preparing nearly 900 people to work at global think tanks.

Atlas Network holds four regional Liberty Forums (in Asia, Africa, Latin America, and Europe) and an international conference in the United States. At its December 2021 "Liberty Forum and Freedom Dinner" in Miami, Florida, for think tank partners from around the world, Mario Vargas Llosa and Yeonmi Park were among the 800 attendees, and Yotuel Romero performed. Llosa, a Nobel Prize winner and classical liberal, is considered a friend of the organization. Adam Weinberg, an Atlas Network executive, wrote in the New York Post that its Liberty Forums are "like an Anti-Davos", offering trade-show-type environments for think tanks to exchange ideas.

In Canada, Atlas Network partners with about a dozen think tanks, including the Macdonald-Laurier Institute, Montreal Economic Institute, the Fraser Institute, the Frontier Centre for Public Policy, SecondStreet.org. Atlas Network has also partnered with the F. A. Hayek Foundation in Slovakia, the Association for Liberal Thinking in Turkey, the Lithuanian Free Market Institute, and Libertad y Desarrollo in Chile to establish Free Enterprise Training Centers. The organization also partners with Chile's Fundación Piensa and Argentina's Libertad y Progreso.

In 2021, Atlas Network partnered with Cuban anti-communism activist Ruhama Fernandez to share her story after Fernandez was arrested for criticizing the Cuban government. The Ukraine-based Bendukidze Free Market Center is also an Atlas Network partner. Commentator Deroy Murdock, an Atlas Network senior fellow as of 2017, wrote that the organization "encourages institutions to use local knowledge to reduce government obstacles to upward mobility", featuring local entrepreneurs who overcome such obstacles.

In Australia, Atlas Network has partnered with several free-market think tanks, including the Centre for Independent Studies, Institute of Public Affairs, and LibertyWorks (founded by entrepreneur Andrew Cooper). In New Zealand, Atlas Network has partnered with the New Zealand Taxpayers' Union. ACT New Zealand leader David Seymour once worked for the Atlas Network-affiliated Frontier Centre for Public Policy in Canada. Atlas Network chair Debbi Gibbs' father Alan Gibbs helped found the ACT party. In May 2024, Atlas Network co-hosted its Europe Liberty Forum in Madrid with its Spanish partner Fundalib (Foundation for the Advancement of Liberty).

=== Grants ===
In the early 2000s, Atlas Network moved to distribute general purpose funds through grant competitions. The organization provides limited amounts of financial support to new think tanks on a case-by-case basis. Grants are usually given for specific projects and range between $2,000 and $5,000. In 2020, Atlas Network provided more than $5 million in the form of grants to support its network of more than 500 partners worldwide. According to Atlas Network, its grants fund coaching, networking, pitch competitions, award programs, and other "ambitious projects for policy change". By the end of 2024, Atlas Network said it had 581 partners in more 100 countries worldwide; The Guardian reported it had "more than 450 think tanks" in May 2024.

The organization funds Costa Rica's IDEAS Labs, which helped reform the country's pension laws in 2020. Atlas Network also supports the Philippines-based Foundation for Economic Freedom, which works on property rights. Atlas Network supports the Burundian think tank CDE Great Lakes, which has helped reduce the paperwork and fees required to start a business in the country. The think tank works with local entrepreneurs, such as "Papa Coriandre", who formalized his small business and has since grown it from two to 139 employees.

=== Awards ===
Atlas Network's Templeton Freedom Award, supported by Templeton Religion Trust and named after Sir John Templeton, was established in 2004. In 2015, the Acton Institute was awarded $100,000 for its documentary film Poverty, Inc. In 2020, the Center for Indonesian Policy Studies won the award for its Affordable Food for the Poor Initiative. In 2021, India's Centre for Civil Society was the winner. In 2022, the Sri Lanka–based Advocata Institute, an Atlas Network partner, won its Asia Liberty Award and the Templeton Freedom Award.

The organization's Think Tank Shark Tank competition allows professionals to pitch their projects to judges. In 2018, Dhananath Fernando won the Asia Think Tank Shark Tank championship for his research on the high cost of construction in Sri Lanka and his proposal to lower the taxes on construction materials. In 2019, Students for Liberty and Entrepreneurship (South Sudan) led by John Mustapha Kutiyote won the award for promoting home ownership by women. Students for Liberty Brasil won the 2021 Latin America competition for their project on educating Brazilian favela residents about property rights.

=== Publications ===
Atlas Network publishes a magazine titled Freedom's Champion twice a year. In 2025, the organization featured economist Milton Friedman and his role in supporting Atlas Network's mission, with Brad Lips saying Friedman's legacy is "more important and influential than ever." The organization also hosted a webinar on Friedman's long-term impact.

== Financials ==
As a non-governmental 501(c)(3) organization, Atlas Network receives donations from foundations, individuals, and corporations, but not government funding. In April 2025, ABC News Australia reported that Atlas Network donors "believe individuals should be empowered to prosper and the state should play a small role."

Atlas Network has received funding from the Charles Koch Foundation and the Charles Koch Institute. Other donors include Donors Trust, Lynde and Harry Bradley Foundation, the John Templeton Foundation, and the Lilly Endowment.

Research by the activist website DeSmog said Atlas Network had received millions of dollars from Koch-affiliated groups, the ExxonMobil Foundation, and the Sarah Scaife Foundation. As of 2005, Atlas Network had received $440,000 from ExxonMobil itself. In 2023, Atlas Network said it had received no funding from oil and gas companies "for nearly 15 years," and reaffirmed this claim in April 2025. In September 2026, the Investigative Journalism Foundation reported that ExxonMobil's donations to Atlas Network "ceased many years ago."

Of Atlas Network partners, 57 percent in the U.S. received funding from the tobacco industry between 1990 and 2000. Atlas Network said that corporate funding accounted for less than 2% of its total donations in 2020. National Review said in 2021 that "fossil-fuel and tobacco interests" provided less than 1% of Atlas Network's funding over two decades, versus 98% from individuals and foundations.

As of 2020, Atlas Network had assets of $13,849,965. In 2023, the group received over $28 million from donors and gave out more than $7.6 million in grants to its partners.

== Partners ==
Notable partners of Atlas Network include think tanks such as the Institute of Economic Affairs in the United Kingdom; the Cato Institute, Manhattan Institute, Pacific Research Institute, the Heartland Institute, the Goldwater Institute, and Acton Institute in the United States; the Fraser Institute, Macdonald–Laurier Institute, Canadian Taxpayers Federation, the Montreal Economic Institute, the American Legislative Exchange Council, and Second Street in Canada; the Centre for Independent Studies in Australia; and the New Zealand Taxpayers' Union. The Heritage Foundation was a member until 2020.
