= COVID-19 pandemic in Europe =

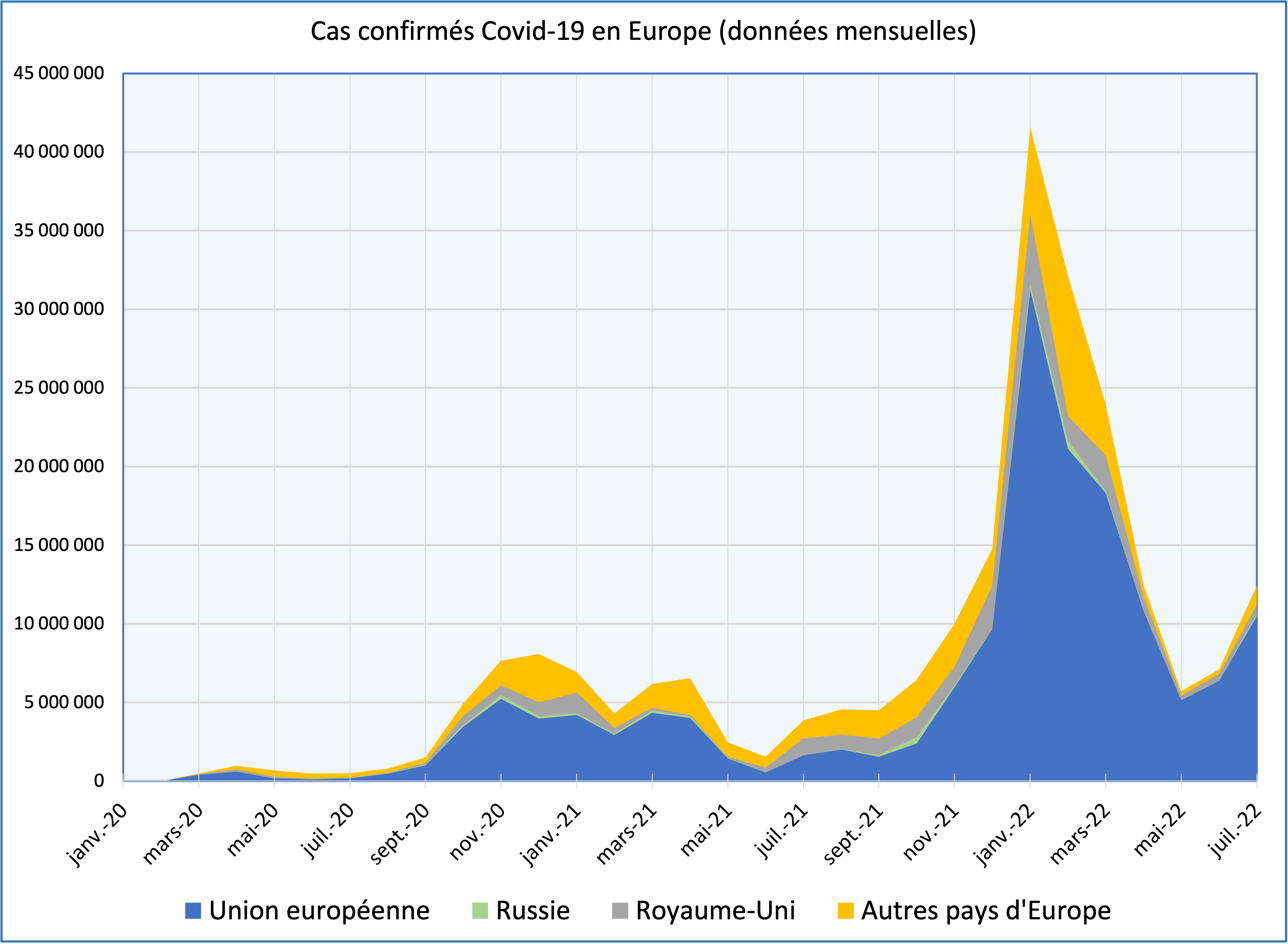
- New COVID cases in Europe by month, from 2020–2022
- Disease: COVID-19
- Pathogen: SARS-CoV-2
- Location: Europe
- First outbreak: Wuhan, Hubei, China
- Index case: Bordeaux, France
- Arrival date: 21 January 2020 (6 years, 10 months and 1 day ago)
- Confirmed cases: 243,000,000+
- Suspected cases: >600,800,000 (>80% of Europe's population, 2021–22 estimates)
- Recovered: 239,000,000+
- Deaths: ~2,000,000
- Territories: 57

The global COVID-19 pandemic arrived in Europe with its first confirmed case in Bordeaux, France, on 24 January 2020, and subsequently spread widely across the continent. By 17 March 2020, every country in Europe had confirmed a case, and all have reported at least one death, with the exception of Vatican City.

Italy was the first European country to experience a major outbreak in early 2020, becoming the first country worldwide to introduce a national lockdown. By 13 March 2020, the World Health Organization (WHO) declared Europe the epicentre of the pandemic and it remained so until the WHO announced it was overtaken by South America on 22 May. By 18 March 2020, lockdowns introduced in Europe affected more than 250 million people. Despite deployment of COVID-19 vaccines, Europe became the pandemic's epicentre once again in late 2021. On 11 January 2022, Dr. Hans Kluge, the WHO Regional Director for Europe said, "more than 50 percent of the population in the region will be infected with Omicron in the next six to eight weeks".

As the outbreak became a major crisis across Europe, national and European Union responses have led to debate over restrictions of civil liberties and the extent of European Union solidarity.

As of 20 May 2022, Europe is the most-affected continent in the world. The most-affected countries in Europe include Italy, France, Germany, the United Kingdom and Russia.

== International comparisons ==
In March 2022, The Lancet published a study comparing excess mortality rates per 100,000 population, in 191 countries in the world, over the first two years of the pandemic (2020 and 2021). The study showed that amongst the major western European countries, those with the highest rates were Italy with 227, Portugal 202, Spain 187, Belgium 147, and the Netherlands 140. The average was 140 and below that were the United Kingdom at 127, France 124, and Germany 121 - the difference between these three was not statistically significant - and that Ireland (13) and the Scandinavian countries had lower rates.

Economic activity decreased by almost 4% in the majority of sub-regions in Europe in 2020, which was similar to the global average of 3.2%. However, the variance between nations is prominent. The high infection and mortality rates of the pandemic in countries in the Western Balkans, the Eastern Neighbourhood, and Central and Eastern Europe meant they faced deeper recessions.

From 2019 to 2020, there was also a difference in how EU countries were adapting to new COVID-19 regulations, one of them being work from home. The proportion of EU enterprises employing advanced digital technology in their operations expanded dramatically during that time. From 2020 to 2021, this percentage remained relatively stable, reaching 61% in 2021, compared to 63% in 2020 and 58% in 2019.

Since the beginning of 2020, EU enterprises that embraced advanced digital technology and invested in becoming more digital during the pandemic have increased the number of employees they employ. The number of non-digital enterprises that downsized was also greater than the share of non-digital firms that had positive job growth. Non-digital companies had a negative net employment balance.

According to a survey of firms by the European Investment Bank, the Czech Republic was the top-performing EU country for the usage of advanced digital technologies during the pandemic. Finland was the top performing EU country in terms of digital infrastructure and the use of formal strategic business monitoring. Austria had the highest percentage of firms becoming more digital during the COVID-19 pandemic. Cyprus led software and data investment, and firms in Sweden invested in digital training for their employees at the highest rate.

== Statistics by country and territory ==
Summary table of statistics in Europe
Country/Territory	Tests	Reported cases	Reported deaths	Reported deaths per 1M population	Estimated excess mortality per 1M population 2020 and 2021	Recoveries	Ref
Albania	1,529,669	334,090	3,604	1,218	3,465	330,233	
Andorra	249,838	48,015	159	1,974	2,055	47,806	
Austria	126,775,946	6,081,287	22,534	2,053	1,075	no data	
Belarus	11,193,320	994,037	7,118	739	4,831	928,536	
Belgium	27,823,927	4,833,699	34,339	2,722	1,466	no data	
Bosnia and Herzegovina	1,505,807	403,364	16,369	4,873	3,339	no data	
Bulgaria	7,692,793	1,331,456	38,657	5,434	6,473	1,289,148	
Croatia	3,877,819	1,274,603	18,306	3,949	2,856	1,255,955	
Cyprus	9,477,138	660,854	1,364	871	322	no data	
Czech Republic	47,516,725	4,700,505	43,090	3,750	2,448	no data	
Denmark	110,395,437	3,418,520	8,838	1,100	941	no data	
Estonia	2,590,874	618,218	3,001	1,938	2,267	614,656	
Faroe Islands	657,000	34,658	28	569	—	no data	
Finland	8,803,391	1,508,603	10,184	848	808	no data	
France	188,795,159	39,997,490	167,985	2,270	1,242	no data	
Germany	89,622,218	38,437,756	174,979	1,663	1,205	no data	
Gibraltar	460,732	20,550	113	3,029	—	no data	
Greece	50,386,399	5,482,697	37,959	2,908	1,271	no data	
Guernsey	—	35,326	41	—	—	35,151	
Hungary	9,285,125	2,217,132	48,862	4,845	2,978	2,118,911	
Iceland	1,425,512	209,191	260	443	-478	no data	
Ireland	11,785,169	1,744,580	9,772	1,980	125	no data	
Isle of Man	133,676	38,008	116	1,246	—	no data	
Italy	148,159,131	26,904,497	197,714	2,777	2,274	26,490,448	
Jersey	—	66,391	161	—	—	66,170	
Kosovo	—	274,269	3,212	—	—	no data	
Latvia	5,684,399	977,068	7,430	3,164	3,520	no data	
Liechtenstein	80,432	21,526	87	2,217	—	16,199	
Lithuania	6,727,723	1,355,324	9,769	3,457	3,850	no data	
Luxembourg	3,847,888	386,030	1,000	1,679	892	no data	
Malta	1,216,068	120,739	885	1,638	899	no data	
Moldova	2,478,148	627,458	12,154	2,877	2,452	no data	
Monaco	54,960	17,181	67	1,433	744	no data	
Montenegro	1,034,265	251,180	2,654	4,333	3,570	no data	
Netherlands	21,107,399	8,610,372	22,992	1,298	1,400	no data	
North Macedonia	1,659,878	349,923	9,960	4,472	5,836	no data	
Norway	9,447,282	1,493,079	5,732	583	72	no data	
Poland	27,922,598	6,769,961	120,869	3,222	2,972	5,335,686	
Portugal	27,780,292	5,633,203	27,738	2,321	2,022	no data	
Romania	17,519,846	3,503,553	68,601	3,461	3,287	no data	
Russia	242,900,000	22,995,765	399,999	2,602	3,746	22,446,519	
San Marino	109,538	25,292	126	3,375	1,896	23,160	
Serbia	7,418,399	2,601,133	18,057	1,857	2,289	no data	
Slovakia	5,184,086	1,869,657	21,167	3,681	2,504	no data	
Slovenia	2,143,592	1,349,318	7,100	3,195	1,799	no data	
Spain	66,213,858	13,980,340	121,852	2,289	1,867	no data	
Sweden	15,268,363	2,734,805	24,513	1,860	912	no data	
Switzerland	14,772,127	4,422,292	13,680	1,591	931	no data	
Turkey	122,223,026	17,004,677	101,419	1,149	1,186	no data	
Ukraine	16,956,514	5,520,483	109,918	2,513	2,217	no data	
United Kingdom	418,708,539	24,812,582 (Note: Cases confirmed by a positive test only.)	232,112 (Note: The UK reports COVID-19 deaths as those within 28 days of a positive test.)	2,614	1,268	no data	
Vatican City	—	29	0	—	—	29	
Total/average	1,898,102,976	163,877,845	1,776,085	2,141			

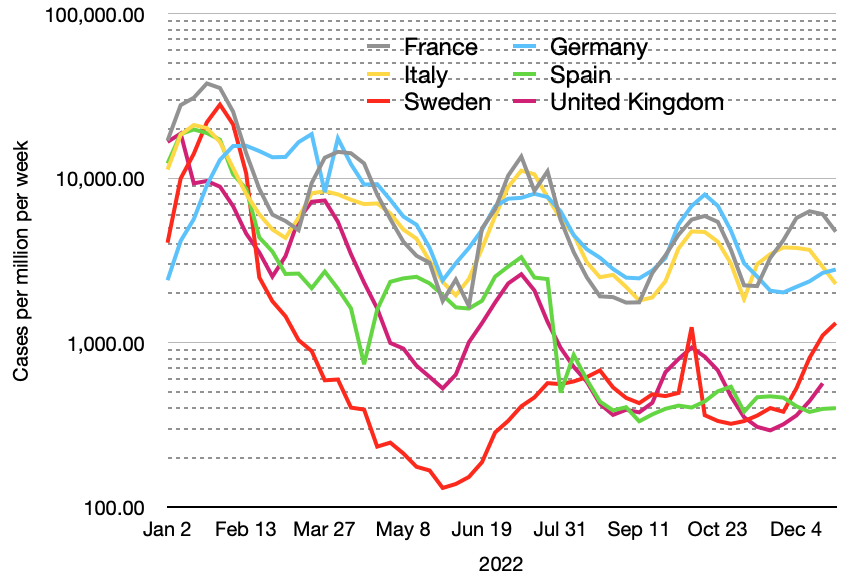
Weekly diagnosed cases per million inhabitants of COVID-19 in major countries in Western Europe. Displayed on semi-log scale starting in 2021.

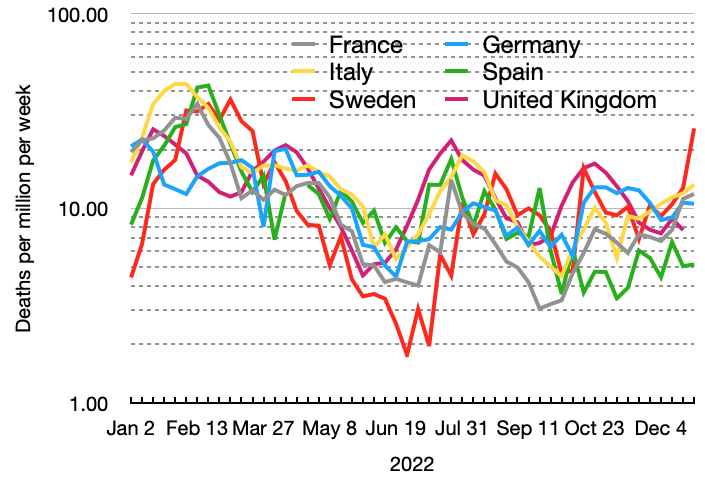
Weekly Deaths per million inhabitants from COVID-19 in major countries in Western Europe. This shows the distinctly different pattern of deaths in Germany and Sweden.

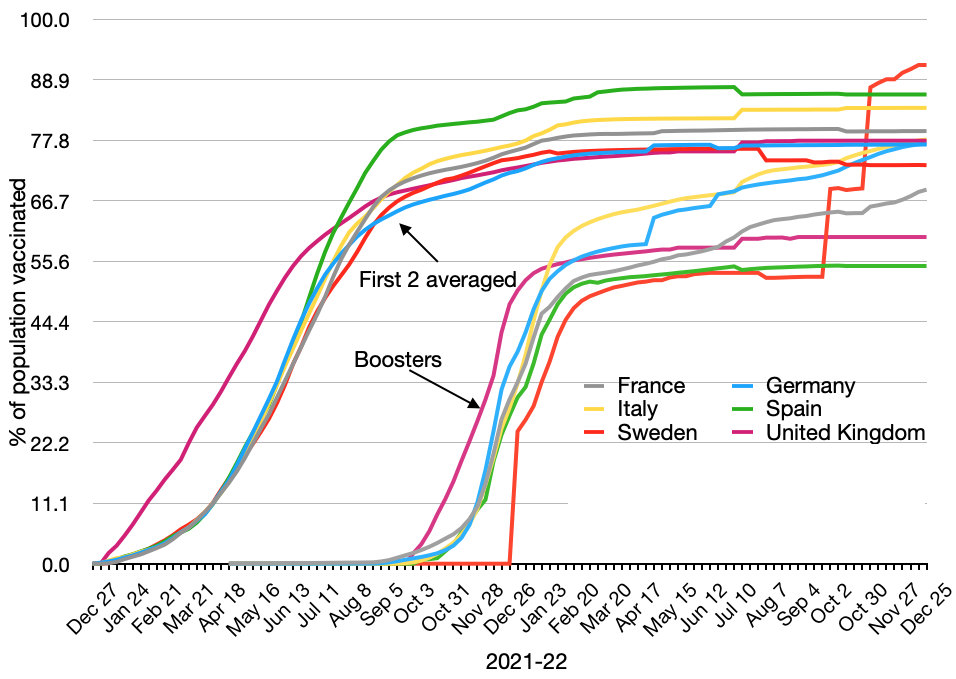
Percentage of people fully vaccinated against COVID-19 in major countries in Western Europe during 2021

In late August, 88% of COVID-19 deaths in Europe were among people over age 65, according to a 30 August report from the WHO.

Cumulative number of deaths per million inhabitants for a selection of European countries, over time. The legend is sorted in descending order of these values. Logarithmic vertical axis. Data source: ECDC.

== Pandemic by country and territory ==
=== Albania ===
The COVID-19 pandemic in Albania was a part of the worldwide pandemic of coronavirus disease 2019 (COVID-19) caused by severe acute respiratory syndrome coronavirus 2 (SARS-CoV-2). The first case in the Republic of Albania was reported in Tirana on 8 March 2020, when a patient and his adult son who had come from Florence, Italy tested positive. Both men later recovered.

On 21 December 2020, health minister Ogerta Manastirliu announced that the country has decided to suspend flights to and from the UK until 6 January 2021 because of what was then a new COVID-19 mutation that transmits more quickly than other variants. All passengers arriving from the UK by land had to self-isolate for 14 days upon entry. The flight suspension took effect on Tuesday, 22 December.

As of 4 February 2023, 3,058,102 COVID-19 vaccine doses have been administered in Albania.

=== Andorra ===
The COVID-19 pandemic in Andorra was a part of the worldwide pandemic of coronavirus disease 2019 (COVID-19) caused by severe acute respiratory syndrome coronavirus 2 (SARS-CoV-2). The virus was confirmed to have reached Andorra on 2 March 2020, when a 20-year-old man returned to the country from Milan, Italy. With a total population of 77,543, (as of 31 December 2019) on 7 December 2020, the infection rate was 1 case per 11 inhabitants, and the death rate was 1 case per 994 inhabitants.

=== Austria ===
The COVID-19 pandemic in Austria was a part of the worldwide pandemic of coronavirus disease 2019 (COVID-19) caused by severe acute respiratory syndrome coronavirus 2 (SARS-CoV-2). In Austria, a pair of cases were confirmed on 25 February 2020. The cases involved a 24-year-old man and a 24-year-old woman who were travelling from Lombardy, Italy, and were treated at a hospital in Innsbruck. According to new figures released by Austrian authorities on 23 June, the first case in the country was recorded in Ischgl, Tyrol on 8 February.

As of 4 February 2023, a total of 20,369,447 vaccine doses have been administered.

=== Belarus ===
The COVID-19 pandemic in Belarus was a part of the worldwide pandemic of coronavirus disease 2019 (COVID-19) caused by severe acute respiratory syndrome coronavirus 2 (SARS-CoV-2). The virus was confirmed to have spread to Belarus, when the first case of COVID-19 in the country was registered in Minsk on 28 February 2020. As of 29 January 2023, a total of 19,047,714 vaccine doses have been administered.

=== Belgium ===
The COVID-19 pandemic in Belgium has resulted in 4,909,042 confirmed cases of COVID-19 and 34,339 deaths.

The virus was confirmed to have spread to Belgium on 4 February 2020, when one of a group of nine Belgians repatriated from Wuhan to Brussels was reported to have tested positive for the coronavirus. Transmission within Belgium was confirmed in early March; authorities linked this to holidaymakers returning from Northern Italy at the end of the half-term holidays. The epidemic increased rapidly in March–April 2020. By the end of March all 10 provinces of the country had registered cases.

By March 2021, Belgium had the third highest number of COVID-19 deaths per head of population in the world, according to data compiled by Johns Hopkins University. However, Belgium may have been over-reporting the number of cases, with health officials reporting that suspected cases were being reported along with confirmed cases. Unlike some countries that publish figures based primarily on confirmed hospital deaths, the death figures reported by the Belgian authorities included deaths in the community, such as in care homes, confirmed to have been caused by the virus, as well as a much larger number of such deaths suspected to have been caused by the virus, even if the person was not tested.

=== Bosnia and Herzegovina ===
The COVID-19 pandemic in Bosnia and Herzegovina was a part of the worldwide pandemic of coronavirus disease 2019 (COVID-19) caused by severe acute respiratory syndrome coronavirus 2 (SARS-CoV-2). The virus was confirmed to have reached Bosnia and Herzegovina on 5 March 2020, when a patient in Banja Luka, who had travelled to Italy, tested positive. Later on the same day, a second case, who was the son of the first case, was reported. On 21 March, the first death in the country from COVID-19 was announced in a hospital in Bihać. The patient was an elderly woman who had been hospitalized two days before.

On 17 March 2020, the Council of Ministers of Bosnia and Herzegovina declared a state of emergency in the entire country.

As of 28 January 2022, 1,924,950 COVID-19 vaccine doses have been administered in Bosnia and Herzegovina.

=== Bulgaria ===
The COVID-19 pandemic in Bulgaria was a part of the worldwide pandemic of coronavirus disease 2019 (COVID-19) caused by severe acute respiratory syndrome coronavirus 2 (SARS-CoV-2). The virus was confirmed to have spread to Bulgaria when the country's first cases, a 27-year-old man from Pleven and a 75-year-old woman from Gabrovo, were confirmed on 8 March 2020. Neither of the two had traveled to areas with known coronavirus cases. The man tested positive for the virus after being hospitalized for a respiratory infection, and authorities announced plans to test several people who were in contact with the two individuals. Two other samples in Pleven and Gabrovo were positive on 8 March. Patient zero remains unknown.

After the number of patients in the country had reached 23, the Bulgarian Parliament voted unanimously to declare a state of emergency from 13 March until 13 April. A 14-day preventive house quarantine was introduced for citizens who had been in contact with a COVID-19 patient or had returned from an overseas region with a high number of cases. For patients tested positive for the virus, a 21-day house quarantine was introduced. This time span was counted from the day a subsequent test came out negative after they had been treated in a hospital or at home. After the World Health Organization (WHO) had established that COVID-19 was more resilient than the initial data was showing, the National Crisis-management Staff increased the recovery house quarantine by a week to 28 days. With the continuing increase of COVID-19 cases on a daily basis, the Bulgarian government requested on 1 April that Parliament extend the state of emergency by one month until 13 May.

As of 5 February 2023, a total of 4,612,386 vaccine doses have been administered.

=== Croatia ===
On 25 February, Croatia confirmed its first case, a 26-year-old man who had been in Milan, Italy. On 26 February, two new cases were confirmed, one being the twin brother of the first. In March 2020, a cluster of cases were reported in numerous Croatian cities. On 12 March, the first recovery was reported, and on 18 March the first death from the virus was confirmed. On 19 March, the number of recorded cases surpassed 100. On 21 March, it surpassed 200. On 25 March, it surpassed 400. On 31 March, it surpassed 800. The pandemic in Croatia occurred during the Croatian Presidency of the Council of the European Union.

On 22 March, an intense earthquake hit Zagreb, the capital of Croatia, causing problems in enforcement of social distancing measures set out by the Government. The earthquake could also be felt across much of Croatia, Bosnia and Herzegovina, Hungary, Slovenia, and Austria.

According to Oxford University, as of 24 March, Croatia was the country with the world's strictest restrictions and measures for infection reduction in relation to the number of infected. The government set up a website for all information about the virus and a new phone line 113 that has volunteers answering questions.

=== Cyprus ===
The COVID-19 pandemic was confirmed to have reached Cyprus on 9 March 2020. Data released by the Cypriot government includes cases in the British Overseas Territory of Akrotiri and Dhekelia, but does not include cases in Northern Cyprus due to the long-running Cyprus dispute.

=== Czech Republic ===
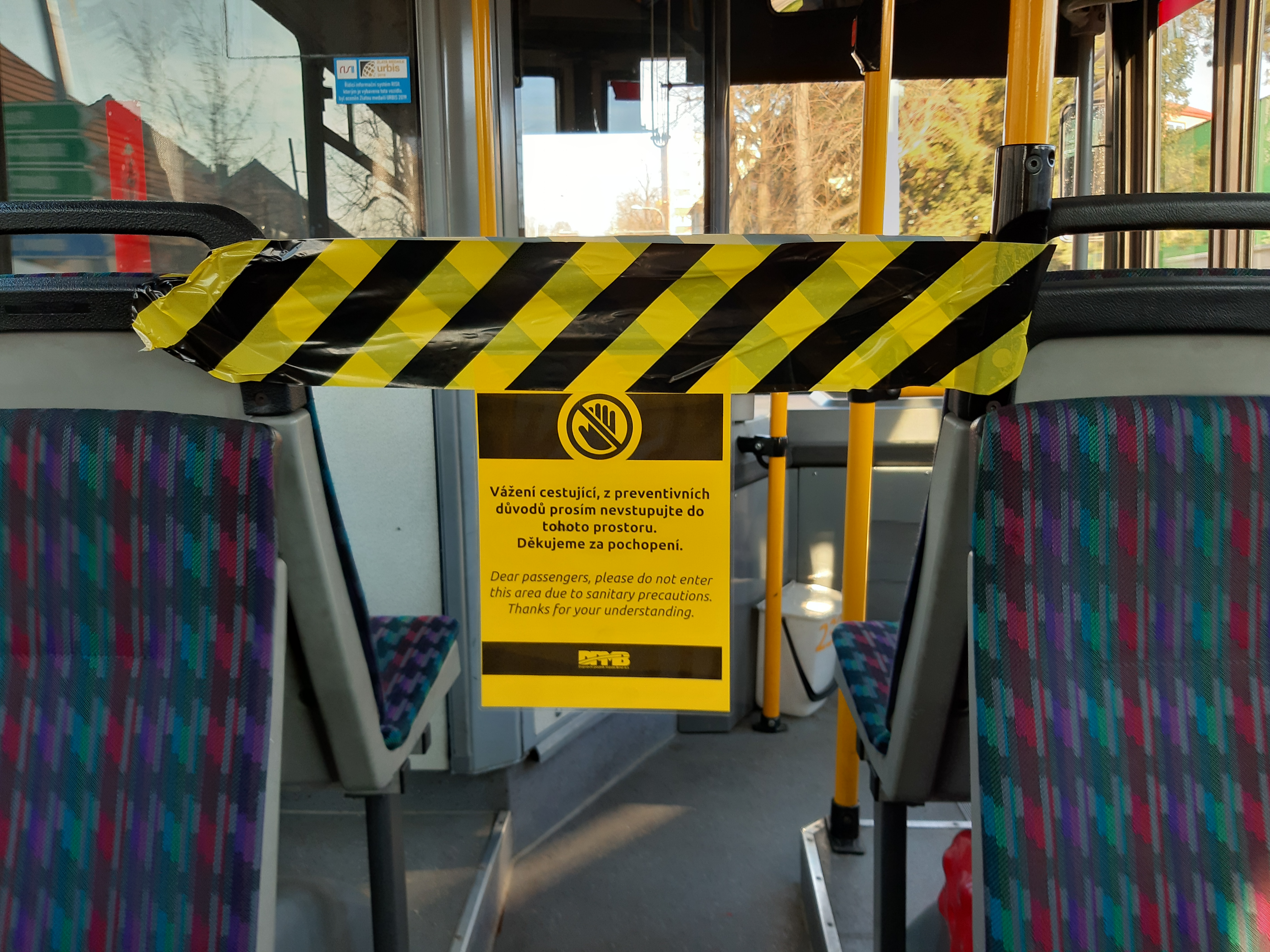
It is forbidden to enter the front section of buses of the Brno Public Transport during the pandemic (14 March 2020)

The first case was reported in the country on 1 March. As of 22 March there had been 1120 confirmed cases, with one lethal outcome.

On 12 March, the Czech Republic declared a 30-day state of emergency and barred entry to non-residents from China, South Korea, Iran, Italy, Spain, Austria, Germany, Switzerland, Sweden, UK, Norway, Denmark and France.

The Czech Republic banned people from going out in public without wearing a face mask or covering their nose and mouth.

=== Denmark ===
On 27 February 2020, Denmark confirmed its first case.

As of 16 March 2020, there have been 898 confirmed cases in Denmark, including 11 in the Faroe Islands (see below).

Numerous preventive measures gradually were implemented. Starting on 13 March 2020, schools, universities and similar places were closed, while most people in non-essential functions have been sent home to work. On 14 March 2020, the borders were closed for all entries, except Danish citizens, people with a residence permit, people with an important reason for visiting, and transport of goods.

=== Estonia ===
On 27 February, Estonia confirmed its first case, an Iranian citizen, travelling from Iran via Turkey.

As of 11 March, there were 17 confirmed cases in Estonia. 12 of them had returned with the infection from Northern Italy, one from France, one from Iran and one from undisclosed risk area. First two cases of virus transmitting locally were in Saaremaa after international volleyball competition involving a team from Milan.

From 12 March, the virus was spreading locally. The number of infected grew fast reaching 109 on 14 March.

=== Finland ===
The first case was reported in the country on 28 January. As of 21 July there were over 7,000 confirmed cases. As of 9 December (2020) the confirmed cases in Finland are 28,732 over the entire period. A total of 433 deaths associated with the disease have been reported until now.

=== France ===
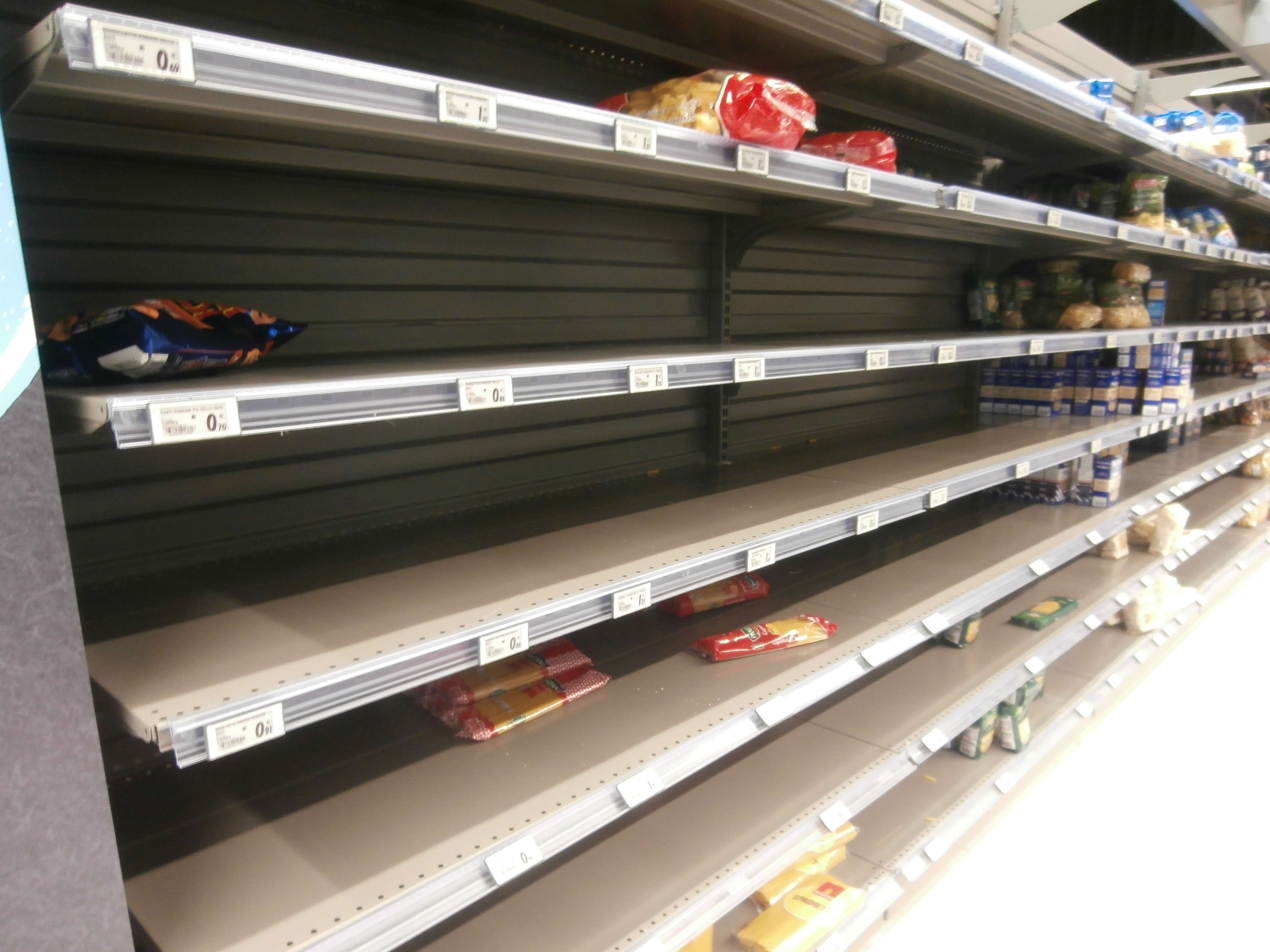
Empty supermarket shelves in Annonay, France, on 14 March 2020.

On 24 January, the first case in Europe was confirmed in Bordeaux. Two more cases were confirmed in Paris by the end of the day, all of them originated from China. A cluster of infections was discovered in Haute-Savoie which originated from a British national who had visited Singapore.

From 31 January to 9 February, nearly 550 people were repatriated from Wuhan on a series of evacuation flights arriving at Creil Air Base in Oise and Istres-Le Tubé Air Base in Istres.

On 14 February, an 80-year-old Chinese tourist died in Bichat–Claude Bernard Hospital, Paris, marking the first death from COVID-19 in Europe and France.

According to regional council president Jean Rottner, the starting point for the first intense wave in Alsace was the Fasting Meeting of the Protestant Free Church of La Porte Ouverte in Mulhouse, with more than 2500 visitors, in mid-February. On 12 March, French president Emmanuel Macron announced on public television that all schools and all universities would close from Monday 16 March until further notice. The next day, the prime minister Édouard Philippe banned gatherings of more than 100 people, not including public transportation. The following day, the prime minister ordered the closure of all nonessential public places, including restaurants, cafés, cinemas, and discothèques, effective at midnight.

As of 14 March, there had been 4,499 confirmed cases (a near-four-fold increase over the number 5 days previously), and 91 deaths in France.

As of 20 March, the number of confirmed cases had risen to 12,612, while the number of deaths reached 450. As of 30 March, more than six hundred doctors and other medical workers are suing the former Minister of Health and the Prime Minister for "culpable negligence" in failing to prepare for the epidemic.

Until 1 April, the daily update of the number of deaths in France included only deaths in hospitals, with deaths in retirement homes or at home not included in the update. Deaths in retirement homes were included in the reported figures from 2 April, causing totals to increase substantially.

On 4 May, retroactive testing of samples in one French hospital showed a patient "who had COVID-19 as early as Dec. 27, nearly a month before the French government confirmed its first cases." According to the researchers who reported the discovery, this indicates that the virus was present in the population well before the first confirmed cases, a finding also echoed by US researchers. In July 2020, Prime Minister of France Jean Castex, announced that health care pay workers will see $9 billion in pay raises, as a result of their efforts during the coronavirus pandemic.

=== Germany ===
In Germany, the first case of COVID-19 was recorded in the state of Bavaria on 27 January 2020. Daily case numbers began to decrease after 8 April, but rose sharply again in October. As of 30 January 2021, 2,207,393 cases have been reported with 56,286 deaths and approximately 1,930,592 recoveries. The case fatality rate is 2.5%. The low preliminary fatality rate in Germany, compared to Italy and Spain, has resulted in a discussion and explanations that cite among others the country's higher number of tests performed, absence of COVID-19 analyses in autopsies and higher proportion of positive cases among younger people. Hessian state finance minister Thomas Schäfer committed suicide on 28 March 2020. State Premier Volker Bouffier said that Schäfer had had considerable worries in particular over the economic burden that the COVID-19 pandemic would place on the population.

=== Gibraltar ===
First case was identified on 4 March 2020, only 187 cases to the end of July then increases with 100 added in August and the same in September. A contact App "BEAT Covid Gibraltar" was released on 18 June.

=== Greece ===
On 26 February 2020, the first case in Greece was confirmed, a 38-year-old woman from Thessaloniki who had recently visited Northern Italy. The next day, the first patient's 9-year-old child and another 40-year-old woman, who had travelled to Italy, also tested positive. Subsequent cases is Greece were mainly related to people who had travelled to Italy and a group of pilgrims who had travelled to Israel and Egypt, as well as their contacts. Health and state authorities issued precautionary guidelines and recommendations, while measures up to that point were taken locally and included the closure of schools and the suspension of cultural events in the affected areas (particularly Ilia, Achaea and Zakynthos). The first confirmed death from COVID-19 in Greece was a 66-year-old man, who died on 12 March.

By 27 July there were 4,227 confirmed cases in Greece, some of which detected among tourists arriving in the country from mid-June onwards, 202 deaths and 3,562 recoveries. The Greek National Public Health Organization (NPHO), in collaboration with local authorities and doctors, is tracking and testing everyone who came in close contact with the patients. By 10 March, with 89 confirmed cases and no deaths in the country, the government decided to suspend the operation of educational institutions of all levels nationwide and then, on 13 March, to close down all cafes, bars, museums, shopping centres, sports facilities and restaurants in the country. On 16 March, all retail shops were also closed and all services in all areas of religious worship of any religion or dogma were suspended. On 18 and 19 March, the government announced a series of measures of more than 10 billion euros to support the economy, businesses and employees.

On 22 March the Greek authorities announced significant restrictions on all nonessential transport and movement across the country, starting from 6 a.m. on 23 March. Starting from 4 May, Greece has begun easing its lockdown restrictions after a 42-day lockdown, with the gradual lifting of movement restrictions and restart of business activity.

=== Guernsey ===
On 9 March, the first case in the Crown dependency was confirmed. On 27 May it was announced that there were no known active cases in the Bailiwick. There were no active cases for 129 days before an arrival from the UK tested positive on 6 September.

=== Hungary ===
On 4 March Prime Minister Viktor Orbán announced that two Iranian students had been infected with the virus. The students are asymptomatic and have been transported to Saint Ladislaus Hospital in Budapest.

=== Iceland ===
The first case was confirmed in Iceland on 28 February, an Icelandic male in his forties who had been on a ski trip to Andalo in Northern Italy and returned home on 22 February.

Iceland's Department of Civil Protection and Emergency Management declared a state of emergency on 6 March after two cases of community transmission in Iceland were confirmed, bringing the total number of confirmed cases to 43. On 13 March, it was announced at an official press conference that a four-week ban on public gatherings of more than 100 persons would be put into effect as of Monday 16 March. Universities and secondary schools will be closed for four weeks. International airports and harbours will remain exempt from these measures.

=== Ireland ===
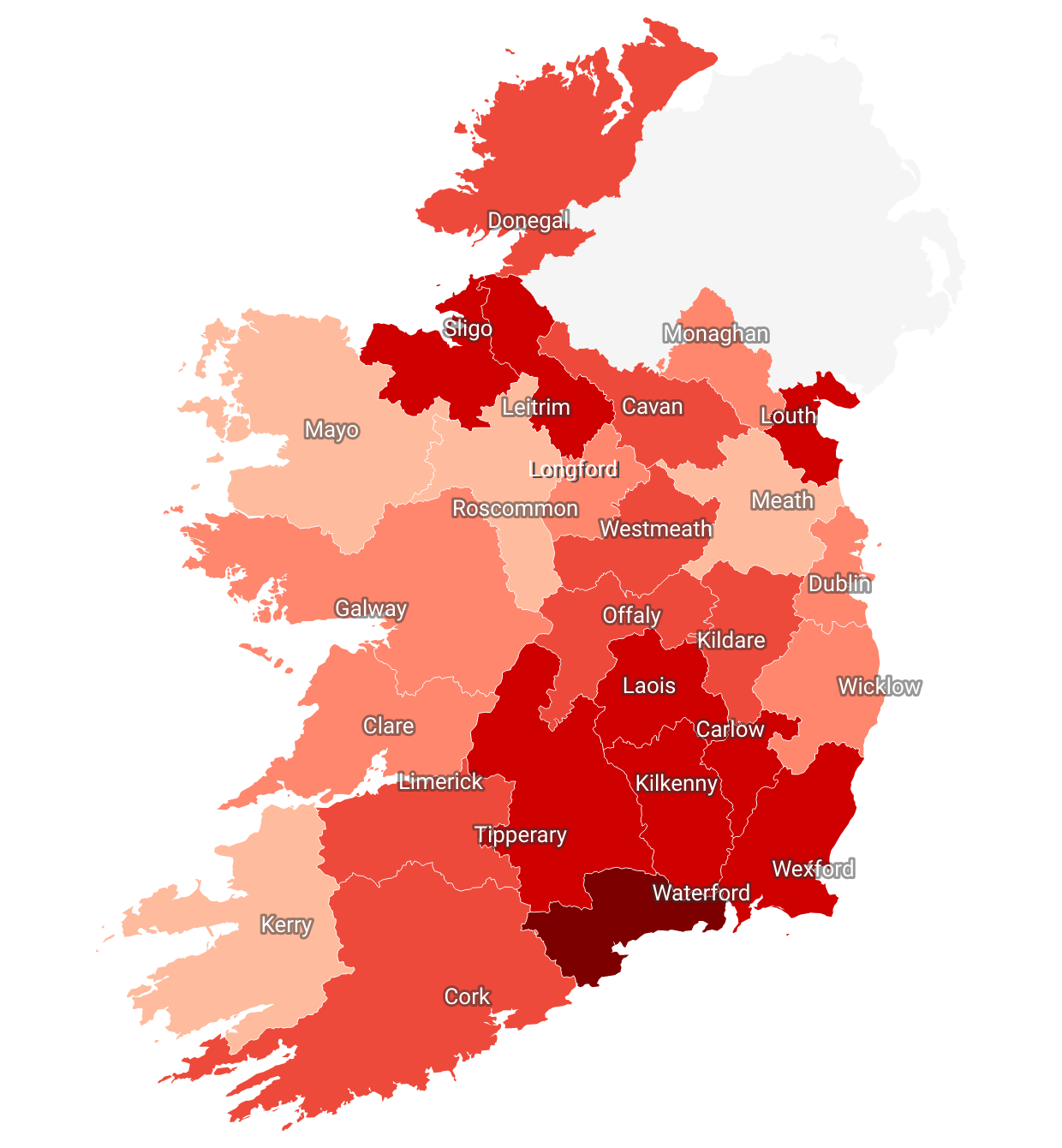
COVID-19 14-day rate per 100k population in Ireland by county, as of 2023

The National Public Health Emergency Team of Ireland announced the first case in the Republic of Ireland on 29 February, involving a male student from the east of the country, who had arrived there from Northern Italy. On 3 March, a second case was confirmed of a female in the east of the country who had been to Northern Italy. Response to the outbreak has included cancellation of St Patrick's Day parades and all festivals. On 11 March, an elderly patient in Naas General Hospital in County Kildare became Ireland's first fatality from the virus. On 12 March, Taoiseach Leo Varadkar announced the closure of all schools, colleges and childcare facilities. On 20 March, an emergency legislation was signed into law by President Michael D. Higgins giving the state permission to detain people, restrict travel and keep people in their homes to help combat the spread of the pandemic.

==== Lockdown ====
On 12 March 2020, Taoiseach Leo Varadkar announced the closure of all schools, colleges and childcare facilities in Ireland until the end of August. On 27 March, Varadkar announced a national stay-at-home order for at least two weeks; the public were ordered to stay at home in all circumstances. All non-essential shops and services, including all pubs, bars, hotels and nightclubs closed and all public and private gatherings of any number of people was banned. The Garda Síochána (Irish police) were given power to enforce the measures, which were repeatedly extended until 18 May.

A roadmap to easing restrictions in Ireland that included five stages was adopted by the government on 1 May 2020 and subsequently published online. The fourth and final phase of easing COVID-19 restrictions in Ireland was initially scheduled to take place on 20 July, but was repeatedly postponed until 31 August at the earliest.

On 15 September, the government announced a medium-term plan for living with COVID-19 that included five levels of restrictions.

All non-essential businesses and services closed and all public and private gatherings of any number of people was banned again on 21 October following the government's announcement to move the entire country to Level 5 lockdown restrictions for six weeks until 1 December. On 27 November, the government agreed to ease restrictions from 1 December.

A third wave of COVID-19 arrived in Ireland on 21 December. The government acted swiftly and on 22 December, Level 5 lockdown restrictions with a number of adjustments were announced, which came into effect from Christmas Eve until 12 January 2021 at the earliest.

All non-essential businesses and services closed and all public and private gatherings of any number of people was banned again on 31 December (New Year's Eve) following the government's announcement to move the entire country to full Level 5 lockdown restrictions from 30 December until 31 January 2021 at the earliest, in an attempt to get a third surge in cases of COVID-19 under control. On 26 January, the government extended the Level 5 lockdown restrictions until 5 March. On 23 February, the government extended the Level 5 lockdown restrictions for another six weeks until 5 April (Easter Monday) at the earliest, while its new revised Living with COVID-19 plan was published.

On 30 March, the government announced a phased easing of restrictions from Monday 12 April. On 29 April, the government announced a reopening plan for the country throughout May and June from 10 May, with a further reopening planned announced on 31 August that would see all remaining COVID-19 restrictions in Ireland eased by 22 October.

After a fourth wave of COVID-19 arrived in Ireland in October, the government published on 19 October a revised plan for the easing of restrictions, with nightclubs allowed to reopen, however the continued use of masks, vaccine certificates and social distancing measures would remain in place until at least February 2022. On 3 December, the government reintroduced a series of measures that would commence from 7 December amid concerns of the Omicron variant, with nightclubs to close, indoor cultural and sporting events to operate at 50% capacity and a maximum of four households allowed to meet indoors.

The Omicron variant caused a fifth wave of COVID-19 to arrive in late December and early January 2022, with record levels of cases reported over the Christmas and New Year period. As cases began to fall sharply, Taoiseach Micheál Martin announced on 21 January the easing of almost all COVID-19 restrictions, with the requirements of vaccine certificates and social distancing to end, restrictions on household visits and capacity limits for indoor and outdoor events to end, nightclubs to reopen and pubs and restaurants to resume normal trading times, while rules on isolation and the wearing of masks would remain. Remaining COVID-19 restrictions were agreed to be removed from 28 February, with mask wearing in schools, indoor retail settings and on public transport to be voluntary, restrictions in schools to end and testing to be scaled back.

As of 21 February 2022, the Department of Health have confirmed 1,276,778 confirmed cases and 6,443 deaths.

=== Italy ===
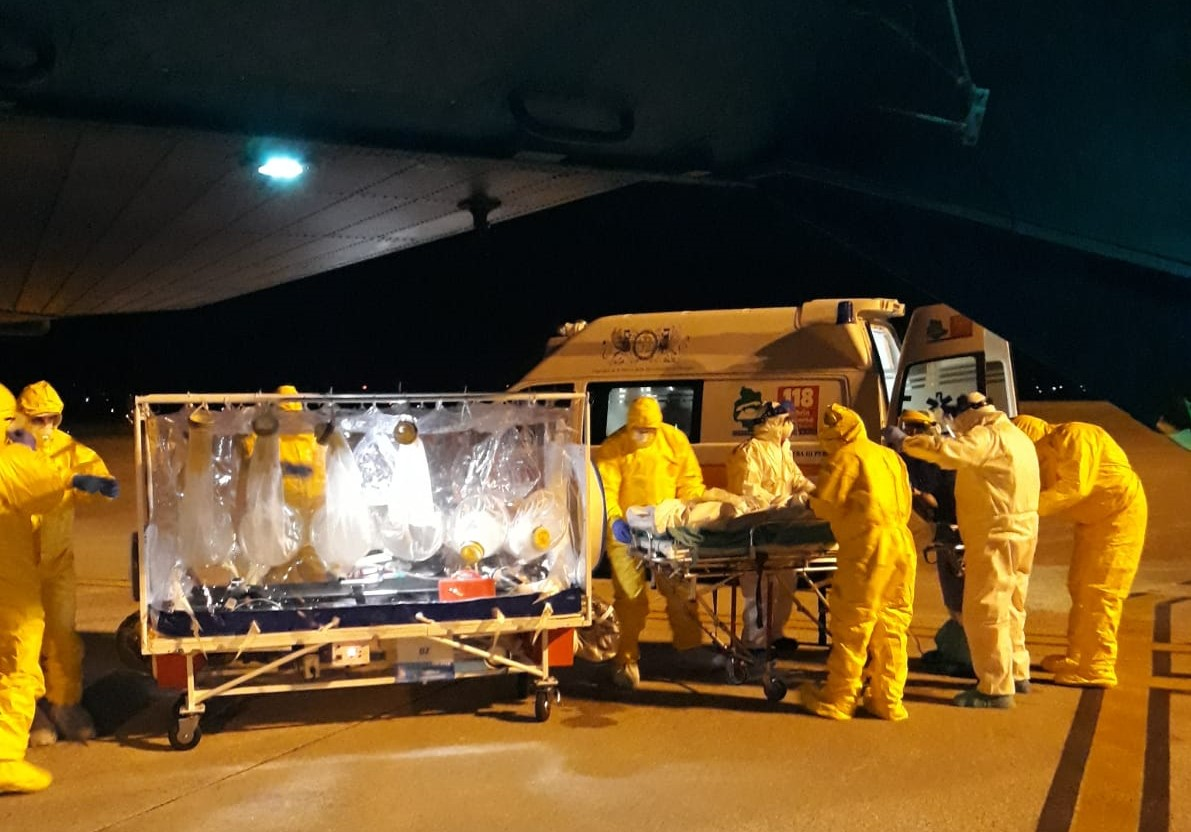
Paramedics carrying a patient under biocontainment, in Cervia, Emilia-Romagna

On 31 January, the first two cases were confirmed in Rome. Two Chinese tourists, who arrived in Milan on 23 January via Milan Malpensa Airport and travelled to Rome on a tourist bus, tested positive for and were hospitalised in Lazzaro Spallanzani National Institute for Infectious Diseases.

On 6 February, one of the Italians repatriated from Wuhan, China, tested positive, bringing the total number of cases in Italy to three. On 22 February, the repatriated Italian recovered and was discharged from the hospital. On 22 and 26 February, the two Chinese tourists hospitalized in Rome tested negative.

On 21 February, a cluster of cases was detected starting with 16 confirmed cases in Lombardy, with additional 60 cases on 22 February, and Italy's first deaths reported on the same day. As of late February, Italy was hit harder than anywhere else in the EU by the COVID-19 pandemic.

By 17 March 2020, there were 2,503 deaths and 31,506 confirmed cases. By 15 May 2020, there had been 223,885 cases and 31,610 deaths, according to Protezione Civile bulletins.

On 3 June, Italy reopened its borders to EU residents and ended travel restrictions.

On 13 July, the head of the ICU at a Bergamo hospital said that former patients treated for COVID-19 had developed serious long-term health issues.

Cases reached 100,000 in March, 200,000 in April, 300,000 in September, 600,000 in October and 1,600,000 in November.

==== Lockdown ====
On 8 March, Italian prime minister Giuseppe Conte signed a decree enacting a quarantine for the entire region of Lombardy – home to more than 10 million people and the financial capital, Milan – and multiple other provinces, totalling around 16 million residents. The lockdown decree included the power to impose fines on anyone caught entering or leaving Lombardy, the worst-affected region, until 3 April.

On 9 March, the lockdown orders were extended to the whole of Italy, effectively quarantining more than 60 million people.

On 20 November 2020, according to high-frequency data, the lockdowns in France and Italy weighed down on public mobility more than in any other European country. France's official statistic agency INSEE found that the data collected by Google on the amount of time people spend at home is particularly closely correlated with the percentage of slow down experienced by an economy during the lockdown.

=== Jersey ===
The first case was recognised on 10 March which resulted within days in flights and ferries being cancelled except for essential travel and freight, thus isolating the island by the end of March. By 30 June there were no active cases although there have since been small numbers of cases brought into the island when lockdown was relaxed and travel permitted. On 14 October a contact App was launched. Community contracted cases caused numbers to rise from 600 to 1,000 in November resulting in another lockdown.

=== Kosovo ===
The first two cases in Kosovo were reported on 13 March. In the ten-day period 13–23 March, the number of positive cases with coronavirus rose to 35. In midnight of 23 March 26 new cases were confirmed, bringing the total number of cases to 61. Kosovars were required to wear masks and not visit their families across the street due to the lockdowns, the income and sales tax was also reduced by local governments.

=== Latvia ===
The COVID-19 pandemic in Latvia was a part of the worldwide pandemic of coronavirus disease 2019 (COVID-19) caused by severe acute respiratory syndrome coronavirus 2 (SARS-CoV-2). The virus was confirmed to have reached Latvia on 2 March 2020, having been brought along with people returning from abroad.

The government declared a state of emergency on 13 March 2020 with a number of epidemiological safety measures and restrictions, primarily limiting gatherings, travel, most public venues, and educational institutions. As the new confirmed cases stayed in the low two-digit range per day, the emergency was periodically extended until mid-2020, when the confirmed infection case dropped to almost 0 and the state of emergency ended on 9 June 2020. Most restrictions were lifted.

The rates spiked again by the end of September, from a few dozen per day to low hundreds by November, and many of the restrictions were restored and tightened, including a range of new ones. Eventually, a new state of emergency was reinstated on 9 November 2020 with increased rules and restrictions, while the daily cases reached close to one thousand by the end of November. The number of cases kept rising at the turn of the year and the state of emergency was extended to 6 April 2021. The vaccination programme began at the start of the year.

As of 21 January 2023, 2,974,692 COVID-19 vaccine doses had been administered in Latvia.

=== Liechtenstein ===
The first case was reported in the country on 3 March.

=== Lithuania ===
The first case was reported in the country on 28 February. By 17 March there were 21 cases, mostly in Vilnius, Kaunas and Klaipėda. The first infected Lithuanian recovered on 14 March. Cases reached 2,000 in July, 10,000 in October and 50,000 in November.

=== Luxembourg ===
The first case was reported in the country on 29 February. Positive cases exceeded 6,600 on 30 June and 8,500 on 30 September.

=== Malta ===
On 7 March, Malta reported its first 3 cases of coronavirus: an Italian family consisting of a 12-year-old girl and her parents, who arrived in Malta on 3 March from Rome after a holiday in Trentino. Until around September, there were barely any cases; with that maximum cases per day at around 30. But then a big wave hit Malta and cases were being of over 100 everyday, and the most cases found in a single day was 510. Then in May 2021, the cases started calming down with Malta as of 20 June 2021 having just under 50 active cases, with over 30 thousand total.

=== Moldova ===
The COVID-19 pandemic in Moldova was a part of the worldwide pandemic of coronavirus disease 2019 (COVID-19) caused by severe acute respiratory syndrome coronavirus 2 (SARS-CoV-2). The virus was confirmed to have reached the Republic of Moldova on 7 March 2020, when a Moldovan woman who returned from Italy tested positive for the novel coronavirus. As the number of infected people started to rise during the next days, the Parliament declared a state of emergency on 17 March 2020 for the entire territory of the Republic of Moldova for a period of 60 days (17 March to 15 May 2020).

On 15 May 2020, the last day of the state of emergency declared by the Parliament on 17 March 2020, the Extraordinary National Commission of Public Health declared the state of emergency in public health for the entire territory of Moldova for the period of 16 May to 30 June 2020. On 9 June 2020, the total number of confirmed cases surpassed 10,000. On 1 September 2020, the number of deaths surpassed 1,000.

The vaccination process started on 2 March 2021 with AstraZeneca vaccine units donated by Romania to Moldova.

=== Monaco ===
The first case was reported in the country on 29 February.

=== Montenegro ===
The COVID-19 pandemic in Montenegro has resulted in 251,280 confirmed cases of COVID-19 and 2,654 deaths.

The first case of the disease in Montenegro was confirmed on 17 March 2020, making it the last European country to register a case of SARS-CoV-2. On 24 May 2020, 68 days after the first case was recorded in Montenegro, it became the first COVID-19-free country in Europe. Within the first outbreak, indexed cases counted 9% of the total reported, 80% of cases were infected due to contact with primary cases, while the origin of infection of the other 11% of cases was not certain. The Government of Montenegro estimated that the country needs EUR 59.2 million private and international relief to address the health, social and economical impact of COVID-19.

Montenegro had no active cases from 24 May until 14 June 2020, when the first imported case was reported.

As of 3 December 2022, 523,735 COVID-19 vaccine doses have been administered in Montenegro.

=== Netherlands ===
On 27 February, the Netherlands confirmed its first case, a man who had been in the Lombardy region of Italy.

On 6 March, RIVM announced the first death.

On 9 March, RIVM announced 56 more confirmed cases in addition to the total of the 77 infected patients declared in the previous day, bringing the total to 321 infected and 3 dead.

On 15 March, the Dutch government announced in a press conference that all schools, day care facilities, colleges, universities, and universities of applied sciences would close until 6 April, though children of parents in vital industries could still go to school or the day care if they could not be taken care of otherwise.

As of 16 March, the total number of confirmed cases of COVID-19 had risen to 1,413 and the total number of confirmed deaths had risen to 24. This was an increase of 278 infections and 4 deaths in comparison to 15 March.

On the same date, the prime minister of the Netherlands, Mark Rutte, had announced that the country would not go into complete lockdown. Instead the situation would be controlled as much as possible by delaying the spread of the virus, relying on measures taken earlier by the government, such as social distancing and prohibiting gatherings of 100 people and over. It is expected the coronavirus will keep spreading and a large part of the population will become infected. Instead of opting to lock down the Netherlands for the time required, which would have many (negative) consequences while the benefits remain uncertain and would have to stay in place, it would be attempted to build herd immunity in a controlled manner. Depending on how the virus behaves, the government would decide if additional measures are required.

Further measures were introduced on 23 March. All events would be banned until 1 September. Gatherings of more than three people, except for families, were to be prohibited. City mayors received greater authorization to enforce the rules. Fines would be issued to those not complying with the new rules.

Cases reached 10,000 in March 2020, 50,000 in June 2020, 100,000 in September 2020, 500,000 in November 2020 and 1,000,000 in February 2021.

=== North Macedonia ===
On 26 February, North Macedonia confirmed its first case, a woman that had returned from Italy. On 10 March every school, kindergarten and university was closed. As of 5 April 2021, the country has reported 134,867 cases, 3,940 deaths and a total of 109,297 recovered.

To stop the spreading of the virus, the country had a strict 61-hour curfew every weekend. For holidays, like Easter, the country had an 85-hour curfew. Furthermore, the state of emergency which had expired was extended for 14 more days until 30 May, and then again for 14 more days until 13 June.

=== Norway ===
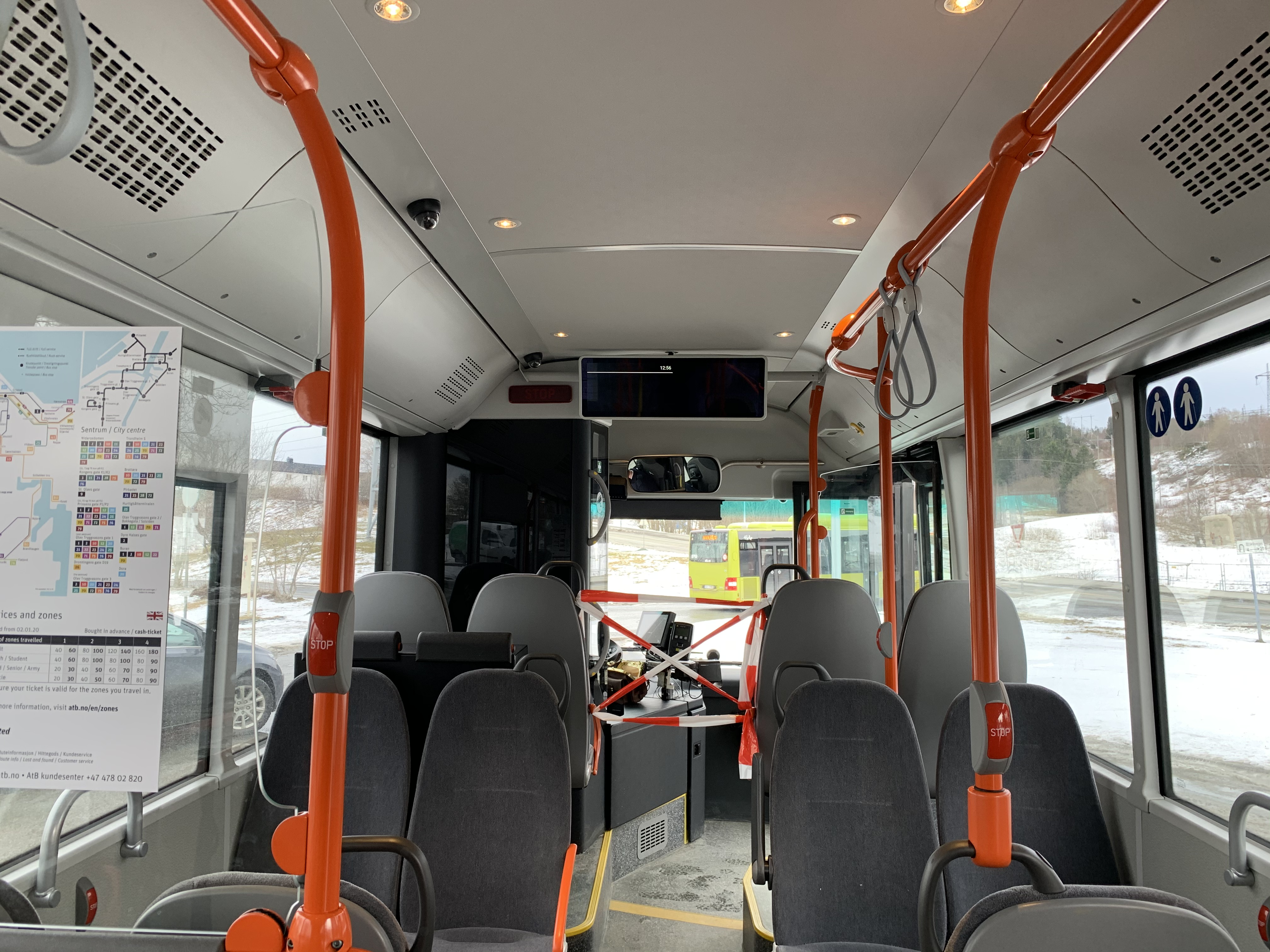
Separation of an area near the driver, bus in Trondheim, 15 March

On 26 February, Norway confirmed its first case, in a person who had returned from China the previous week.

On 7 March, there were 147 confirmed cases in Norway. Most of the cases could either be linked to outbreaks abroad or close encounters with these. Altogether 89 have been infected on travel in Italy.

On 12 March 2020, all kindergartens, schools, colleges and universities were closed until at least 26 March 2020.

=== Poland ===
The COVID-19 pandemic in Poland was part of the COVID-19 pandemic. COVID-19 is caused by SARS-CoV-2. As of 8 June 2025, Poland had a cumulative total of 6,780,272 confirmed cases (17,862 per 100,000 population), and 120,980 deaths (319 per 100,000 population) due to COVID-19.

The first COVID-19 vaccine product was introduced on 23 December 2020. Since then, a total of 58.63 million vaccine doses have been administered, with 60% of the population having received a complete primary series and 34% having received at least one booster dose as of 31 December 2023.

In February and March 2020, health authorities in Poland carried out laboratory testing of suspected cases of infection by SARS-CoV-2, as well as home quarantine and monitoring. On 4 March 2020, the first laboratory-confirmed case in Poland was announced in a man hospitalised in Zielona Góra. On 10 March 2020, the World Health Organization declared the local transmission phase of SARS-CoV-2 in Poland. On 12 March 2020, the first death from coronavirus disease 2019 (COVID-19) in Poland was that of a 57-year-old woman.

Polish authorities opted into the European Union's tender procedure for purchasing COVID-19 pandemic-related medical equipment on 17 March 2020.

On 10–12 March 2020 lockdown-type control measures were implemented, closing school and university classes, offices, and cancelling mass events, and were strengthened on 25 March, limiting non-family gatherings to two people and religious gatherings to six and forbidding non-essential travel. On 20 March 2020, the Ministry of Health officially declared an epidemic and on the same day tried to prevent medical personnel from commenting on the pandemic. The Polish Ombudsman Adam Bodnar defended medical personnel's right to speak publicly about the epidemic on constitutional grounds of freedom of speech and the right of the public to information. Doctors opposed the self-censorship orders.

Lockdown restrictions were tightened on 31 March 2020 by a government regulation, requiring individuals walking in streets to be separated by two metres, closing parks, boulevards, beaches, hairdressers and beauty salons, and forbidding unaccompanied minors from leaving their homes. Restrictions were relaxed starting 20 April, allowing religious gatherings and funerals to be held for up to a maximum of 50 people. Starting on 1 April 2020, fatalities which were clinically or epidemiologically diagnosed as COVID-19 (U07.2) were also considered as COVID-19 deaths by NIPH–NIH.

=== Portugal ===
On 2 March, the first two cases were confirmed in Portugal, both in the city of Porto. One was a doctor who had returned from holiday in northern Italy, and the other a worker from Spain.

On 18 March, the president of the Republic, Marcelo Rebelo de Sousa, declared the entirety of the Portuguese territory in a state of emergency for the following fifteen days, with the possibility of renewal, the first since the Carnation Revolution in 1974.

On 24 March, the Portuguese government admitted that they could not contain the COVID-19 pandemic anymore, as it is wide spreading and will enter the 'Mitigation Phase' on 26 March.

Cases reached 10,000 in April, 100,000 in October and 300,000 in December.

=== Romania ===
The COVID-19 pandemic in Romania, a part of the worldwide pandemic, began on 26 February 2020 when the first case of coronavirus disease 2019 (COVID-19) caused by severe acute respiratory syndrome coronavirus 2 (SARS-CoV-2) in Romania was confirmed in Gorj County was confirmed.

As of 31 January 2022, the National Institute of Public Health reported around 2,200,000 cases, 1,800,000 recoveries, and 60,000 COVID-19-related deaths. More than 11.7 million RT-PCR tests and more than 7.3 million rapid antigen tests were processed.

An anti-COVID-19 vaccination campaign, part of a global effort to slow down the spread of the virus, started on 27 December 2020. As of 27 January 2022, over 50% of the country's eligible population had received at least one dose of the COVID-19 vaccine as part of an ongoing national vaccination campaign.

As of 21 January 2023, 16,102,916 COVID-19 vaccine doses had been administered in Romania.

=== Russia ===
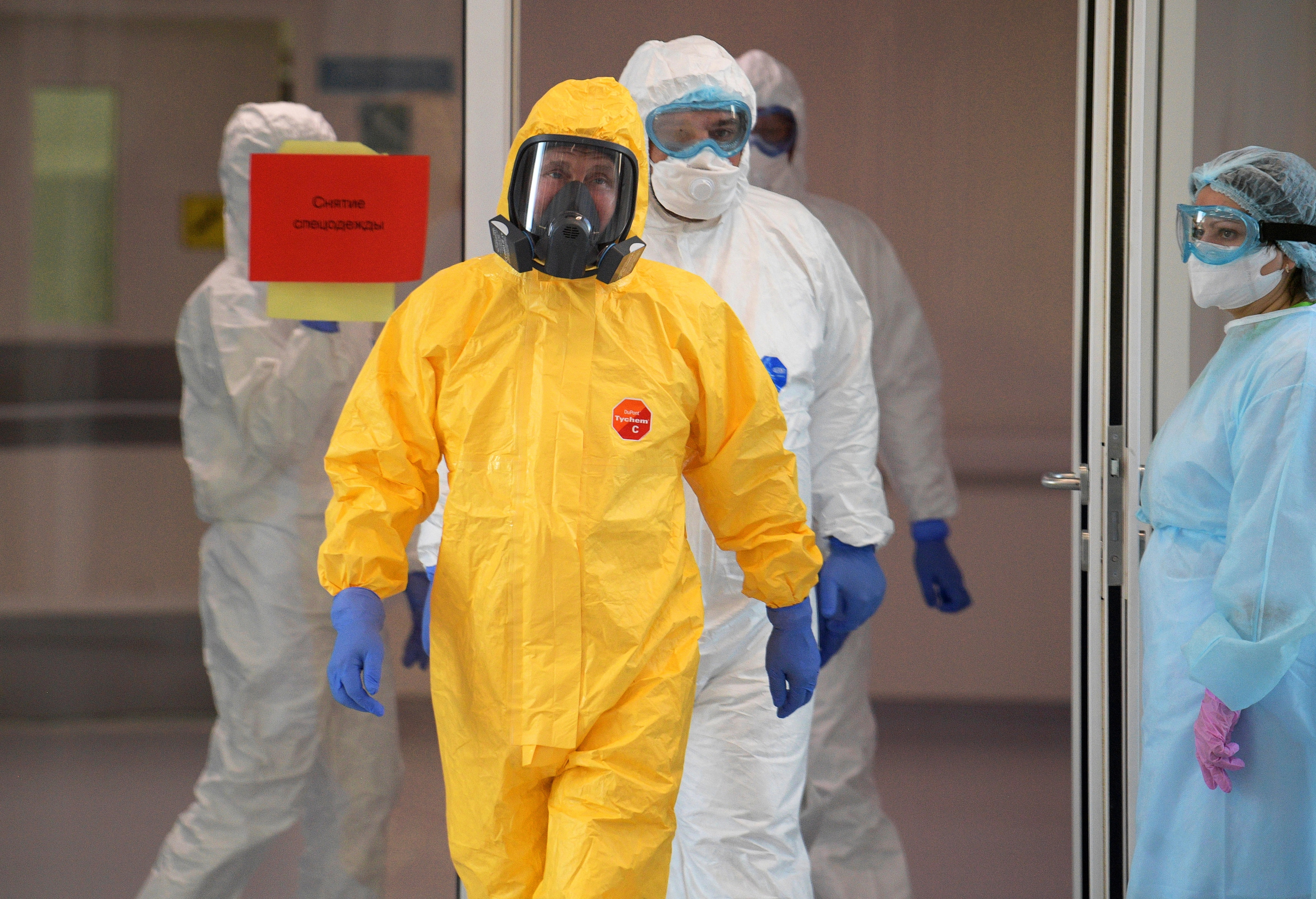
Russian president Vladimir Putin visits coronavirus patients at the City Clinical Hospital No. 40 in Moscow on 24 March

Russia implemented early preventive measures to curb the spread of COVID-19 in the country by imposing quarantines, carrying raids on potential virus carriers and using modern facial recognition technologies to impose quarantine measures.

On 2 March, Western Russia confirmed its first case in Moscow Oblast. Previously on 31 January Russia confirmed first two cases in its Asian part, one in Tyumen Oblast and another in Zabaykalsky Krai. Both were Chinese nationals, who have since recovered.

On 7 March, four new cases were confirmed, three was in Lipetsk and one in Saint Petersburg. All people visited Italy in the previous two weeks.

On 8 March, three news cases were confirmed, in Moscow, Belgorod and Kaliningrad Oblasts. All people returned from Italy.

On 10 March, Moscow Mayor Sergey Sobyanin signed a decree for banning mass events in Moscow with more than 5000 participants from 10 March to 10 April.

By 15 April, cases were confirmed in all of Western Russia's federal subjects with the confirmation of the first case in Nenets Autonomous Okrug.

=== San Marino ===
On 27 February, San Marino confirmed its first case, an 88-year-old man with pre-existing medical conditions, who came from Italy. He was hospitalised at a hospital in Rimini, Italy. As of 25 March 2020: With 700 confirmed cases out of a population of 33,344 (as of 2018), it is the country with the highest percentage of confirmed cases per capita at 2.1% – 1 confirmed case per 48 inhabitants. Also, with 42 confirmed deaths, the country has the highest rate of confirmed deaths per capita at 0.126% of the total population – 1 death per 794 inhabitants.

=== Serbia ===
Disinfection of housing in Serbia during the COVID-19 pandemic

On 29 February, a massive infection occurred in the town of Valjevo after a private party involving a guest from Austria who had previously stayed in Italy. On 6 March, the first case was confirmed in Serbia by Minister of Health Zlatibor Lončar, of a man who had traveled to Budapest. President Aleksandar Vucic and the Government of the Republic of Serbia introduced a state of emergency on 15 March. Two days later, curfew and quarantine were introduced as safeguards against massive infection.

=== Slovakia ===
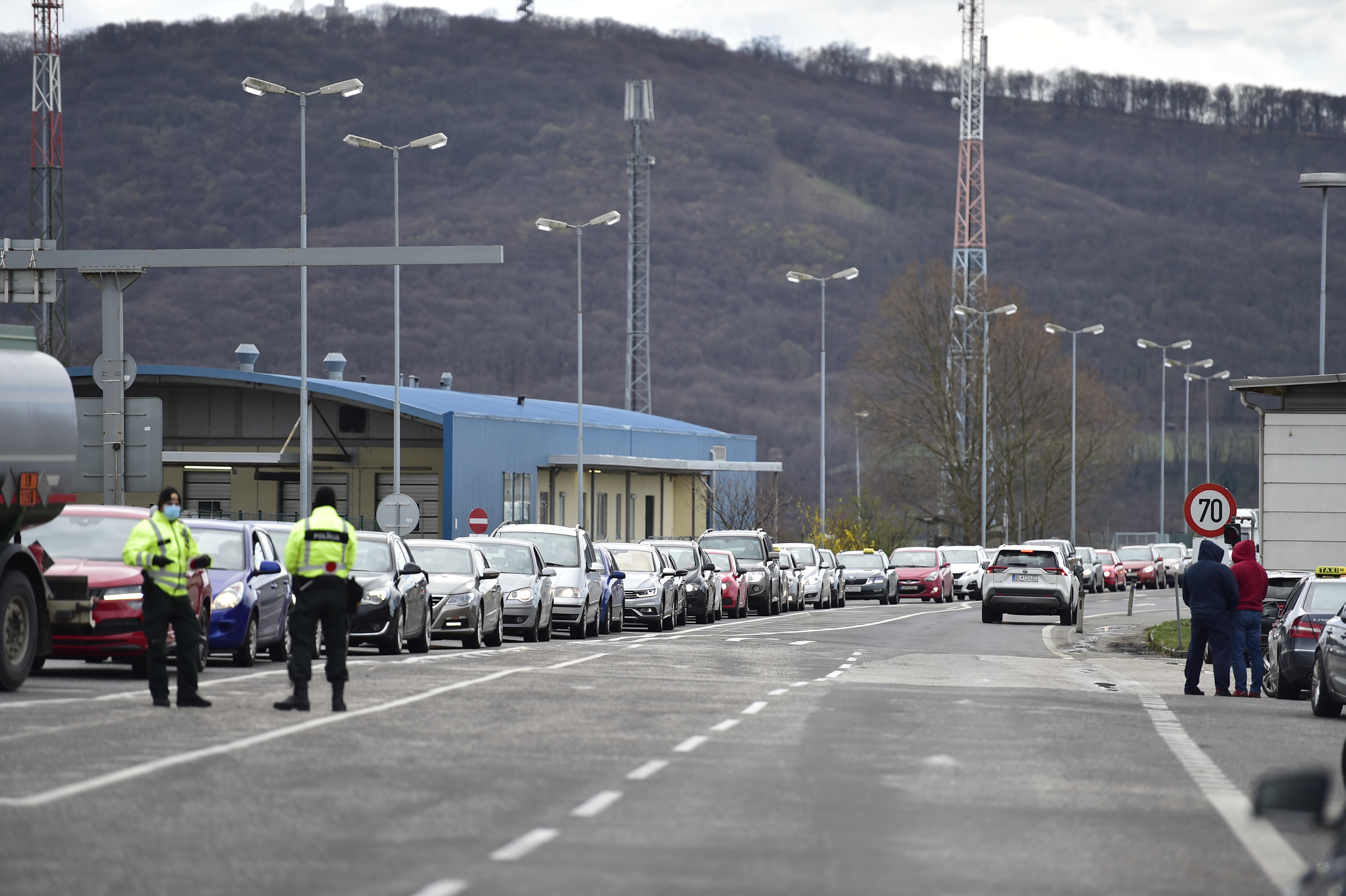
A queue of cars and trucks waiting to cross the Slovak border on 13 March

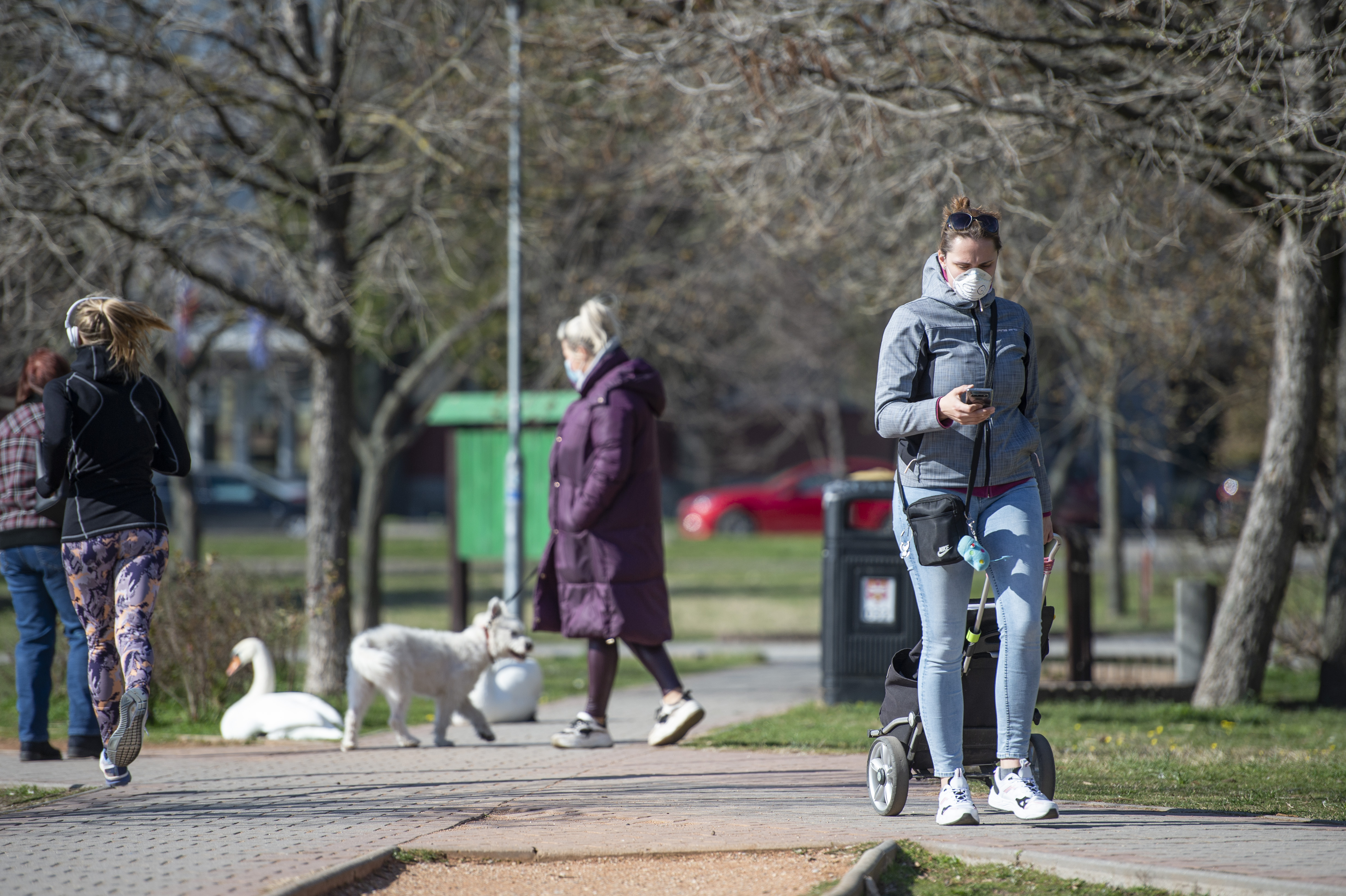
People in Bratislava wearing masks on 16 March

On 6 March, Slovakia confirmed its first case, a 52-year-old man from a small village near Bratislava. He had not travelled anywhere in recent weeks but his son, who didn't show any symptoms, had visited Venice. On 7 March, the virus was also confirmed in his wife and son.

In October 2020, Slovakia started implementation of a short-period mass-testing programme to test two-thirds of its citizens for COVID-19.

=== Slovenia ===
On 4 March Slovenia confirmed its first case. A patient of about 60 years of age had returned from Morocco few days earlier (via Italy) and was admitted to a hospital in Ljubljana.

On 6 March, a total of eight cases were reported, three of them medical professionals, who contracted the virus on holiday in Italy. By 9 March 16 people were confirmed to be infected.

=== Spain ===
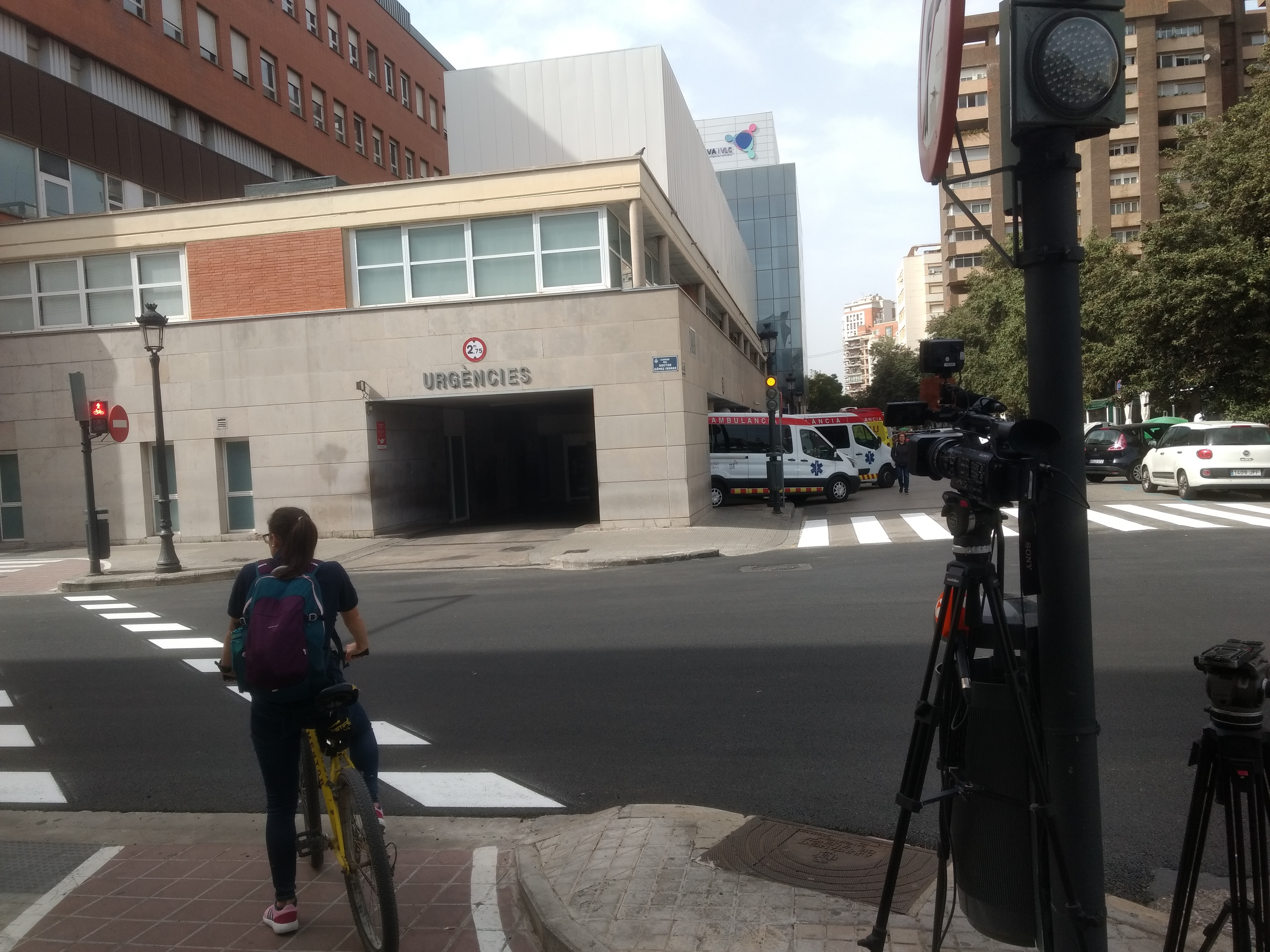
Television cameras covering the first coronavirus cases in a hospital in Valencia

On 31 January, Spain confirmed its first case, in the Canary Island of La Gomera. A tourist from Germany tested positive and was admitted to University Hospital of the Nuestra Señora de Candelaria. On 19 February, 2,500 football fans from Valencia attended a Champions League game in Bergamo, the hot spot of the outbreak in Italy.

On 24 February, a medical doctor from Lombardy, Italy who was vacationing in Tenerife, tested positive at the University Hospital of the Nuestra Señora de Candelaria in Spain. Afterwards, multiple cases were detected in Tenerife involving people who had come in contact with the doctor. Other cases involving individuals who visited Italy were also discovered on Spanish mainland.

On Saturday 14 March, the Spanish government imposed a nationwide quarantine, banned all trips that are not necessary and announced that companies may be intervened to guarantee supplies. However, with universities and schools closed earlier that week, bars and parks were full, and due to slow enactment "part of the population of Madrid and other cities had dispersed across the country". As of 17 March 2020, there had been 11,826 confirmed cases with 1,028 recoveries and 533 deaths in Spain.

On 28 March, the Spanish government tightened up its national lockdown, ordering all non-essential workers to stay at home for the next two weeks. Nearly 900,000 workers lost their jobs in Spain since it went into lockdown in mid-March 2020. Public transport has also been greatly affected by the lockdowns and the severe restrictions established by the government. The relationship between the users who have continued using the urban bus and the characteristics of the stop's surroundings have been analysed.

On 10 January 2022, Spanish Prime Minister Pedro Sánchez initiated a debate in the European Union to treat COVID-19 as an "endemic illness" rather than a pandemic. He suggested a move towards a flu-like monitoring system amid falling death rates and hospitalisations on the European continent.

=== Sweden ===
On 31 January, Sweden confirmed its first case. A woman in her 20s, who had visited Wuhan, tested positive and was admitted at Ryhov County Hospital in Jönköping.

On 26 February, following the outbreak in Italy and in Iran, infection clusters originating from these two countries appeared in Sweden. A number of individuals in Västra Götaland, Jönköping, Stockholm and Uppsala tested positive and were admitted to the infectious disease units in the respective counties.

The country's first fatality came on 11 March, that of a man in Stockholm over 60 who had other illnesses prior to infection.

As of 12 March, national testing strategy shifted to only the elderly, the severely ill, and healthcare personnel. The official recommendation for symptoms that were not serious, as of 13 March, was to stay at home and not visit healthcare. This has led to statistics becoming less useful.

As of 14 March 924 people were reported as having become infected. The Ministry for Foreign Affairs of Sweden made the recommendation to refrain from unnecessary travel to all countries.

On 22 January 2021 the Ministry of Justice of Sweden implemented travel bans from Denmark and the United Kingdom due to the mutation of SARS-CoV-2.

=== Switzerland ===
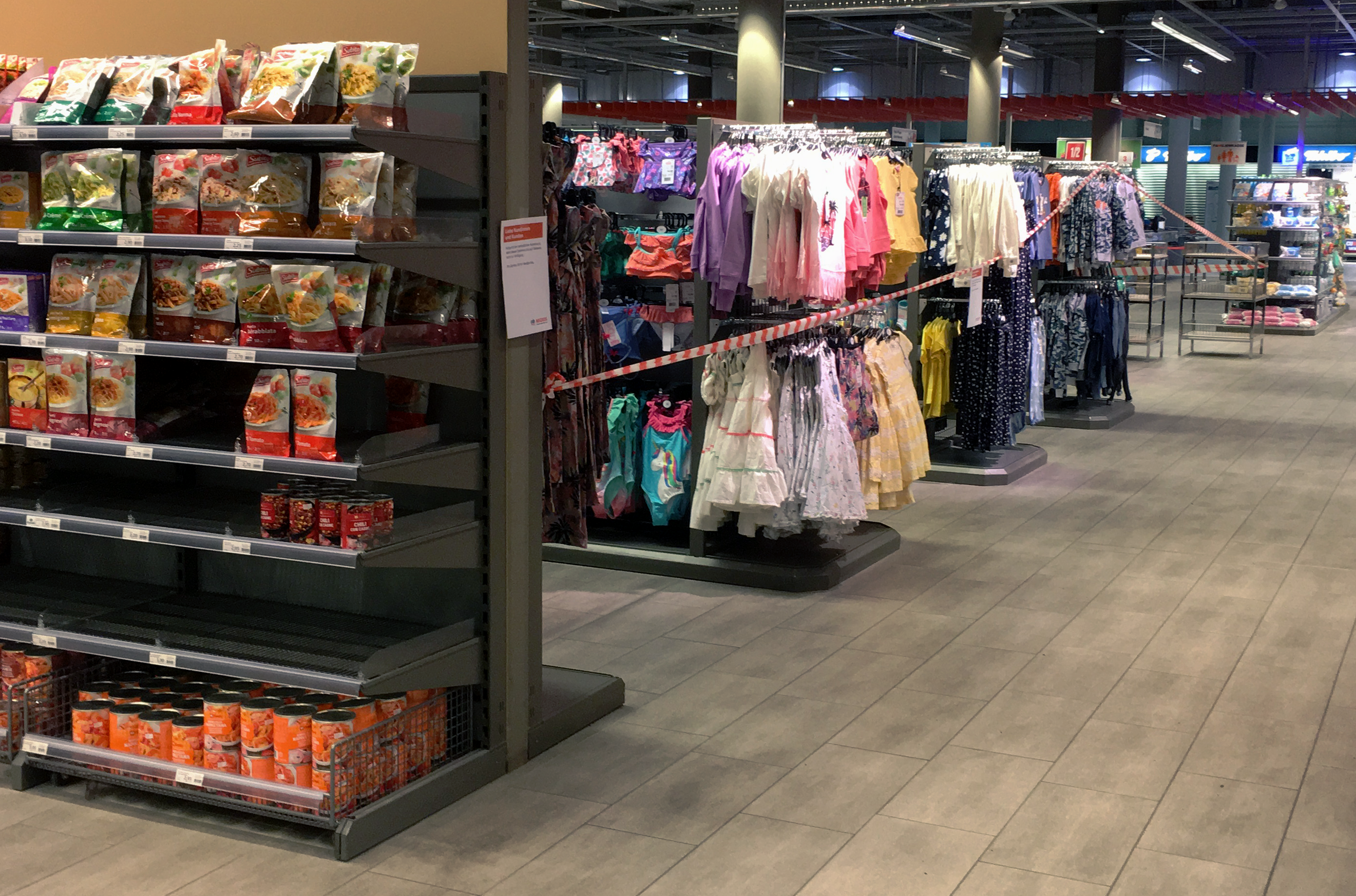
Supermarket with some empty shelves and restricted access to non-vital items

On 25 February, following the outbreak in Italy, Switzerland confirmed its first case, a 70-year-old man in the Italian-speaking canton of Ticino, who had previously visited Milan. Afterwards, multiple cases related to the Italy clusters were discovered in multiple cantons including Basel-City, Zürich and Graubünden. Multiple isolated cases not related to the Italian clusters were also confirmed.

On 28 February, the Federal Council announced an immediate ban on all events with more than 1,000 participants.

As of 10 March, there were 500 confirmed cases in Switzerland. On 16 March 2020, the Federal Council announced further measures, and a revised ordinance. Measures include the closure of bars, shops and other gathering places until 19 April, but leaves open certain essentials, such as grocery stores, pharmacies, (a reduced) public transport and the postal service. Those measures were prolonged until 26 April 2020.

On 23 December, following an unexpectedly quick authorization by Swissmedic of the Pfizer–BioNTech COVID-19 vaccine, the vaccination campaign was launched in several cantons. A 90-year-old woman from the Lucerne region became the first vaccinated patient in continental Europe outside Russia. All cantons are expected to start vaccinating by 11 January 2021.

=== Turkey ===
The COVID-19 pandemic in Turkey is part of the ongoing pandemic of coronavirus disease 2019 (COVID-19) caused by severe acute respiratory syndrome coronavirus 2 (SARS-CoV-2).

The first case in Turkey was recorded on 11 March, when a local returned home (Note: Data Protection Law number 6698 precludes the Turkish Ministry of Health from disclosing sensitive patient health information, interpreted broadly to include location during the pandemic.) from a trip to Europe. The first death due to COVID-19 in the country occurred on 15 March. Turkey stood out from the rest of Europe by not ordering a legal lockdown (Note: Turkey's Article 11/C of the Law on Public Health authorizes only provinces to order quarantines, for a maximum period of 15 days. The national government is barred by the constitution from ordering lockdowns.) until April 2021, when the country enacted its first nationwide restrictions. The government kept many businesses open, and allowed companies to set their own guidelines for workers.

The Turkish health system has the highest number of intensive care units in the world at 46.5 beds per 100,000 people (compared to 9.6 in Greece, 11.6 in France, and 12.6 in Italy). As of 3 May 2021, Turkey's observed case-fatality rate stood at 0.84%, the 148th highest rate globally. This low case-fatality rate has generated various explanations, including the relative rarity of nursing homes, favorable demographics, a long legacy of contact tracing, the high number of intensive care units, universal health care, and a lockdown regime that led to a higher proportion of positive cases among working-age adults. But according to an August 2020 academic study by The International Journal of Health Planning and Management, the government of Turkey has been underreporting COVID-19 statistics.

On 30 September 2020, Turkish Minister of Health Fahrettin Koca acknowledged that since 29 July, the reported number of cases was limited to symptomatic cases that required monitoring, which was met with rebuke by the Turkish Medical Association. This practice ended on 25 November, when the ministry started to report asymptomatic and mildly symptomatic cases alongside symptomatic ones.

=== Ukraine ===
The COVID-19 pandemic in Ukraine has resulted in 5,555,594 confirmed cases of COVID-19 and 109,938 deaths.

The virus was confirmed to have spread to Ukraine when the country's first case was confirmed to be hospitalized in Chernivtsi Oblast on 3 March 2020, a man who had travelled from Italy to Romania by plane and then arrived in Ukraine by car. An emergency was declared on 20 March 2020 in Kyiv Oblast, Chernivtsi Oblast, Zhytomyr Oblast, Dnipropetrovsk Oblast, Ivano-Frankivsk Oblast, and the city of Kyiv. New infections and deaths started to break records by late October 2021. By then, a total of 2.8 million coronavirus cases and 64,936 COVID-19 related deaths had occurred in Ukraine.

Ukraine's ongoing vaccination program started on 24 February 2021 and from that day to 12 September 2021, 10,710,944 vaccinations were given in Ukraine (meaning 18% of the adult population of Ukraine had been vaccinated against COVID-19). About 44% of those vaccinated had been fully vaccinated. In an August 2021 poll 56% of Ukrainians did not plan to be vaccinated. Demand for vaccinations multiplied sharply by late October 2021. On 7 January 2022 the Ministry of Health announced that 44.9% of the adult population had undergone a full course of vaccination.

Statistics for the Russian-held Autonomous Republic of Crimea and city of Sevastopol, and for the unrecognized Donetsk People's Republic and Luhansk People's Republic in eastern Ukraine, are not reported by Ukraine's state agencies, and are not included in the country's totals.

Since the start of the Russian invasion of Ukraine, the Ukrainian Ministry of Healthcare has made no further press releases related to COVID-19, and the latest counts were for 23 February 2022. As a result, daily counts are displayed in various diagrams as zero. In late May 2022, Chief State Sanitary Doctor Ihor Kuzin stated that since the beginning of the invasion, more than 750 studies had been conducted and that COVID-19 outbreaks were not expected in Ukraine in the near future. On 1 July 2023, the Ministry downgraded the disease's alert levels to that of regular respiratory diseases and lifted all emergency measures relating to it.

=== United Kingdom ===
Mark Drakeford, First Minister at the Welsh Government in one of his daily briefings.

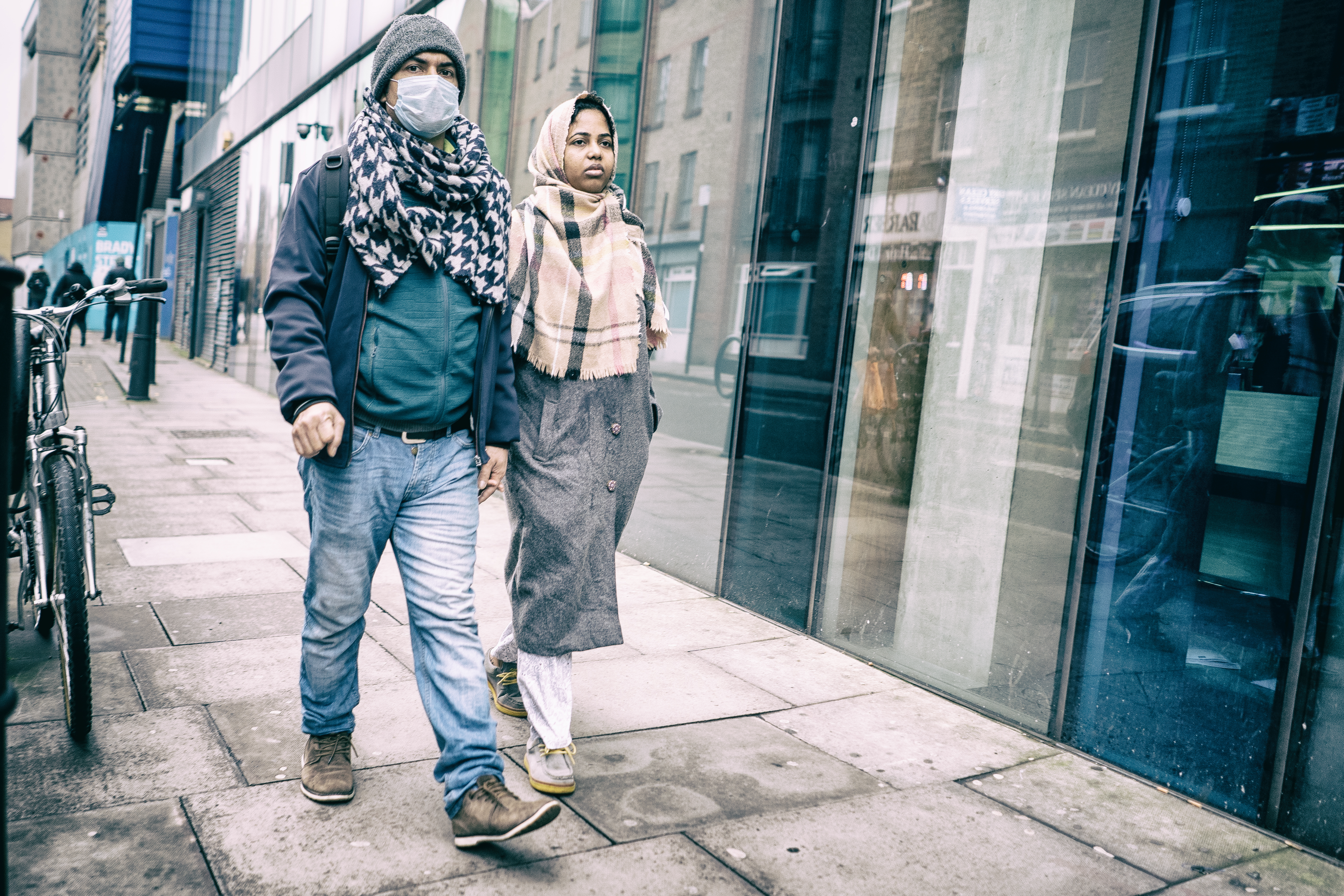
Man in London wearing a face mask on 19 March

In December 2019, Peter Attwood, an 84-year-old from Chatham, Kent, England, developed an unexplained respiratory illness. His symptoms worsened and he was admitted to Medway Hospital on 7 January 2020 and remained in hospital until his death on 30 January 2020. A follow-up pathology test of lung tissue taken during Peter's post-mortem examination showed he had had COVID-19 at the time of his death. Attwood would appear to be the first known UK casualty of SARS-CoV-2.

On 31 January 2020, the first two cases were confirmed in England, both members of a family of Chinese nationals staying in a hotel in York who were taken to specialist facilities in Newcastle upon Tyne. Afterwards, several confirmed cases were detected across the UK. The UK government implemented preventive measures to curb the spread of infections which included contact tracing, isolation and testing, some of which were related to the Italy clusters. The NHS set up drive-through screening centres at several hospitals to test members of the public showing symptoms.

On 2 March, Ministers approved the Department of Health and Social Care COVID-19 action plan, which sets out actions to date, future measures, cooperation between devolved political and health authorities, and the level of preparedness of the country's four National Health Services. It outlined the government's objectives to deploy phased actions to contain, delay, and mitigate any outbreak, using research to inform policy development.

On 23 March, it was announced that the UK would be entering a nationwide lockdown. The public were advised to stay at home except for essential shopping and one hour of exercise a day. These measures came into effect on 26 March and lasted until 1 June when measures were eased allowing early years pupils and exams students to return to school in a limited capacity. These measures are further eased on 15 June when retail and attractions were able to open for the first time since March.

On 25 March, the UK Parliament legislated to provide the government and authorities with emergency powers to handle the COVID-19 pandemic, such as the power to restrict public gatherings, order businesses to close, and the ability to detain those suspected of having the virus. The Coronavirus Act 2020 received Royal Assent on 25 March and came into force on the same day.

On 5 April, the prime minister of the United Kingdom Boris Johnson was admitted to hospital after testing positive to COVID-19 10 days earlier. He was admitted into intensive care the following night, when his symptoms further worsened. He left hospital on 12 April.

The NHS was given access to emergency supplies of PPE and patients that did not need to remain in hospital were moved to residential care homes if needed. However, there was no need for a negative COVID-19 test before patients were transferred to these settings, this was only required from 15 April. On 15 May, the government approved the first social care specific legislation that helped to ensure that staff had access to adequate PPE and protect both those working and living in care homes.

As of 6 May, the total of confirmed cases was 201,101; the total of recorded deaths in all settings was 30,076, the highest in Europe and second highest in all the countries after the United States. It is estimated that care home residents accounted for 30–40% of these deaths, with social care workers being twice as likely to die from COVID-19 as the general population. However, the death toll did not continue to increase throughout the summer, and Brazil and Mexico now have more deaths as of 1 August 2020.

During August and September, the number of infections per day began to increase significantly although the death rate remained fairly low. Boris Johnson announced changes to restrictions on 22 September which included forcing pubs, bars and restaurants to close by 10 pm in England and the so-called rule of six saying no more than six people should meet. In October, Scotland's first minister declared new restrictions it meant that some areas of the country those like Edinburgh had to close bars, pubs and go back to doing self-service. Northern Ireland's executive that also have control over health policy tightened restrictions to make them close to a lockdown as did Wales announced by Welsh first minister. It also emerged that Boris Johnson had been advised by SAGE committee of scientists to have a short lockdown back on 21 September. Johnson subsequently introduced a three-tier system of restrictions Liverpool was put under the top tier meaning tougher restrictions but falling short of a full lockdown. The UK has since recorded over 40,000 deaths.

On 5 November, the UK had to enter a second national lockdown due to the rising number of cases and hospitalisations. Following the end of this lockdown on 2 December case numbers began to rise again and over 70,000 deaths have been recorded in relation to COVID-19 as of 11 December 2020. On 4 January 2021, Prime Minister Boris Johnson addressed the nation announcing a third lockdown. The UK went into Lockdown that day due to rapidly increasing numbers of cases and deaths caused by a new more infectious variant of COVID-19 spreading around the UK.

The UK has begun to vaccinate its population against COVID-19. The first vaccine, the Pfizer/BioNTech vaccine for COVID-19, was approved for use in the UK on 2 December 2020, the first of the 800,000 immediately available doses was administered on 8 December. The second vaccine approved for use in the UK was the Oxford University/AstraZeneca COVID-19 vaccine, which was approved for use on 30 December 2020, with the first dose of this vaccine given on 4 January 2021. A third vaccine, the Moderna vaccine, was approved for use in the UK on 8 January 2021, and the first dose was administered in Wales on 6 April.

=== Vatican City ===
The COVID-19 pandemic in Vatican City was a part of the worldwide pandemic of coronavirus disease 2019 (COVID-19) caused by severe acute respiratory syndrome coronavirus 2 (SARS-CoV-2). The Holy See reported the first case of infection in Vatican City on 7 March 2020. Unlike other jurisdictions that report cases within a given territory or cases of residents or citizens of a territory, the Holy See reports on cases "in Vatican City State and among the employees of the Holy See" regardless of location of testing, treatment, or residence. There were 29 confirmed cases of COVID-19 among the Vatican's residents and employees; there were no associated deaths. The 29 cases included 10 employees, 1 new hire, and 1 resident of Vatican City. (Note: Unlike other governments, the Holy See Press Office reports on diagnoses and status of its employees, not only cases within its jurisdiction. Its announcements are generally imprecise as to the nationality and residence of the cases it reports. One was identified as a resident of Vatican City. Another was diagnosed and is being treated in an Italian location that is neither Vatican City nor Rome.) All those infected tested negative by 6 June 2020. An outbreak among members of the Holy See's Swiss Guard was reported in mid-October, totaling 11 as of October 15.

In late February 2020, Pope Francis became ill with symptoms of a cold, but tested negative for COVID-19. It was announced on January 14, 2021, that both he and Pope Emeritus Benedict XVI had received the first dose of a vaccine. They received their second dose in February.

== Pandemic development graphs ==
=== Confirmed cases and deaths by date ===
Confirmed cases by date

View source data.

Deaths by date

View source data.

=== Total confirmed cases since first day of the outbreak ===
View source data.

=== Growth rates comparison since outbreak ===
Syncing the start date to the 10th case, comparing the daily growth in cases

View source data.

Syncing the start date to the 10th case, comparing the daily deaths

View source data.

Daily new cases; syncing the start date to the 100th case:

View source data.

Daily new cases; syncing the start date to the 500th case:

View source data.

== Response and criticism ==
=== Immigrants and refugees ===
The European Union closed borders to non-nationals on 17 March. The next day, Greece imposed restrictions on refugees' movement within camps. Thousands of asylum seekers are living in crowded camps, and there are fears that pandemic could not be controlled under such conditions. The Greek prime minister K. Mitsotakis said that Europe should do more to help because Greece "cannot resolve this crisis instantly and alone". Unnamed Greek officials have stated concerns that Turkey may send infected refugees and migrants towards the islands. Early in April Malta and Italy closed their ports to vessels carrying asylum seekers from North Africa.

=== Computational approach ===
The Exscalate4Cov project, founded by the Horizon 2020 program, conducted a series of drug repositioning and virtual screening experiments to evaluate the interactions between known drugs and billions of other compounds against the spike protein. These experiments utilized in-silico computational models.

The E4C drug repositioning and in-silico large-scale screening experiments on two European supercomputers identified raloxifene as a candidate for treating early-stage COVID-19 patients.

=== Vaccination ===
In early 2021, EU commission chief Ursula von der Leyen was criticised for the EU's slow rollout, and she noted that the EU was "late to authorise" and said that ordering vaccines on behalf of member states was "the right thing to do". Some countries withheld recommending the AstraZeneca vaccine due to concerns of blood clots. By 20 June 2021, nearly half the population of the European Union had received at least one dose of COVID-19 vaccination.

In November 2021, a study by the European Centre for Disease Prevention and Control estimated that 470,000 lives over the age of 60 had been saved since the start of vaccination roll-out in the European region.

=== Herd immunity through infection in Iceland ===
On 23 February 2022, the Ministry of Health lifted all remaining COVID-19 restrictions, including gathering limits, restricted opening hours for bars, and border restrictions. Adopting a herd immunity approach, the ministry stated that "widespread societal resistance to COVID-19 is the main route out of the epidemic", and "to achieve this, as many people as possible need to be infected with the virus as the vaccines are not enough, even though they provide good protection against serious illness".

=== Criticism ===
==== Travel bans and border closures ====
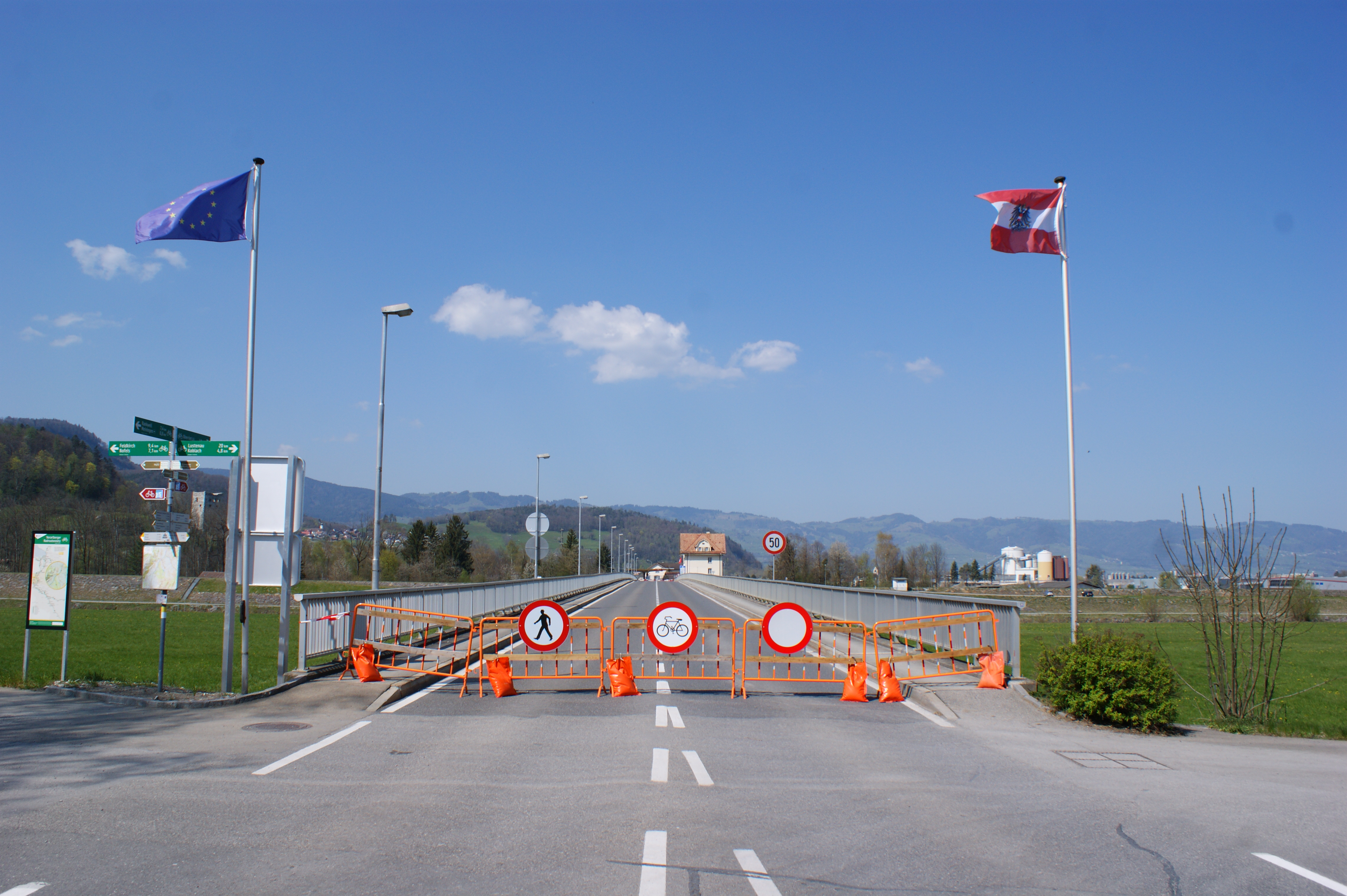
Full closure of a bridge over the Rhine, on the border between Austria and Switzerland

Although by 7 March some European politicians such as France's Marine Le Pen had called for Europe's internal borders to be temporarily closed, the European Union by 13 March continued to reject the idea of suspending the Schengen free travel area and introducing border controls with Italy. The deputy leader of the Swiss Ticino League, Lorenzo Quadri, by 29 February had criticised the decision, saying, "It is alarming that the dogma of wide-open borders is considered a priority." United States president Donald Trump said by 12 March the European Union had "failed to take the same precautions and restrict travel from China and other hot spots" as the US had implemented. Trump also said that "As a result a large number of new clusters in the United States were seeded by travellers from Europe." Research on coronavirus genomes indicates the majority of COVID-19 cases in New York came from European travelers, rather than directly from China or any other Asian country.

By 9 March, Czech prime minister Andrej Babiš stated that "European countries cannot ban the entry of Italian citizens within the Schengen area. The only possible way is to have the Italian prime minister call on his fellow citizens to refrain from traveling to other countries of the European Union."

After Slovakia, Denmark, the Czech Republic and Poland announced complete closure of their national borders, the European Commission President Ursula von der Leyen said by 12 March that "Certain controls may be justified, but general travel bans are not seen as being the most effective by the World Health Organization. Moreover, they have a strong social and economic impact, they disrupt people's lives and business across the borders." European Union leaders condemned the US decision to restrict travel from Europe to the United States. European Council President Charles Michel and Ursula von der Leyen said in a joint statement: "The European Union disapproves of the fact that the US decision to impose a travel ban was taken unilaterally and without consultation." Ursula von der Leyen admitted by 17 March that "all of us who are not experts initially underestimated the coronavirus."

As of 22 February 2021, the UK has banned direct flights from 33 countries, including Portugal, South Africa, Peru and the United Arab Emirates. All travelers entering the UK via indirect flights have been ordered to quarantine in a designated hotel for 10 days. Since passengers coming from high-risk countries with South African virus's mutant (like the UAE and South Africa) are mixing with other travellers before reaching their accommodation, this travel ban is being criticised extensively.

==== EU solidarity ====
The Italian government has criticised EU's lack of solidarity with Italy. Politico reported on 7 March that "EU countries have so far refused Italy's plea for help fighting coronavirus, as national capitals worry that they may need to stockpile face masks and other medical gear to help their own citizens, officials and diplomats said." Maurizio Massari, Italy's ambassador to the EU, said that "Only China responded bilaterally. Certainly, this is not a good sign of European solidarity." Serbian president Aleksandar Vučić said that "European solidarity does not exist. That was a fairy tale."

Eventually, in July 2020 the European Council agreed to a massive recovery fund of 750 billion € branded Next Generation EU (NGEU) to support member states hit by the COVID-19 pandemic. The NGEU fund goes over the years 2021 – 2023 and will be tied to the 2021–2027 budget of the EU (MFF). The comprehensive packages of NGEU and MFF will reach the size of 1824.3 Billion €.

In response to the pandemic, the European Investment Bank Group is establishing a €25 billion Pan-European Guarantee fund. It is projected that the guarantee fund would raise up to €200 billion. The EIB Group signed a new EUR 8.6 billion assistance agreement for its pandemic response programs in 2022. Since pandemic recovery has been slowed down, the allocation time for the guarantee goods under the pan-European Guarantee Fund (EGF), which was introduced in 2020, was extended until the end of 2022.

==== Reaction time of Spain ====
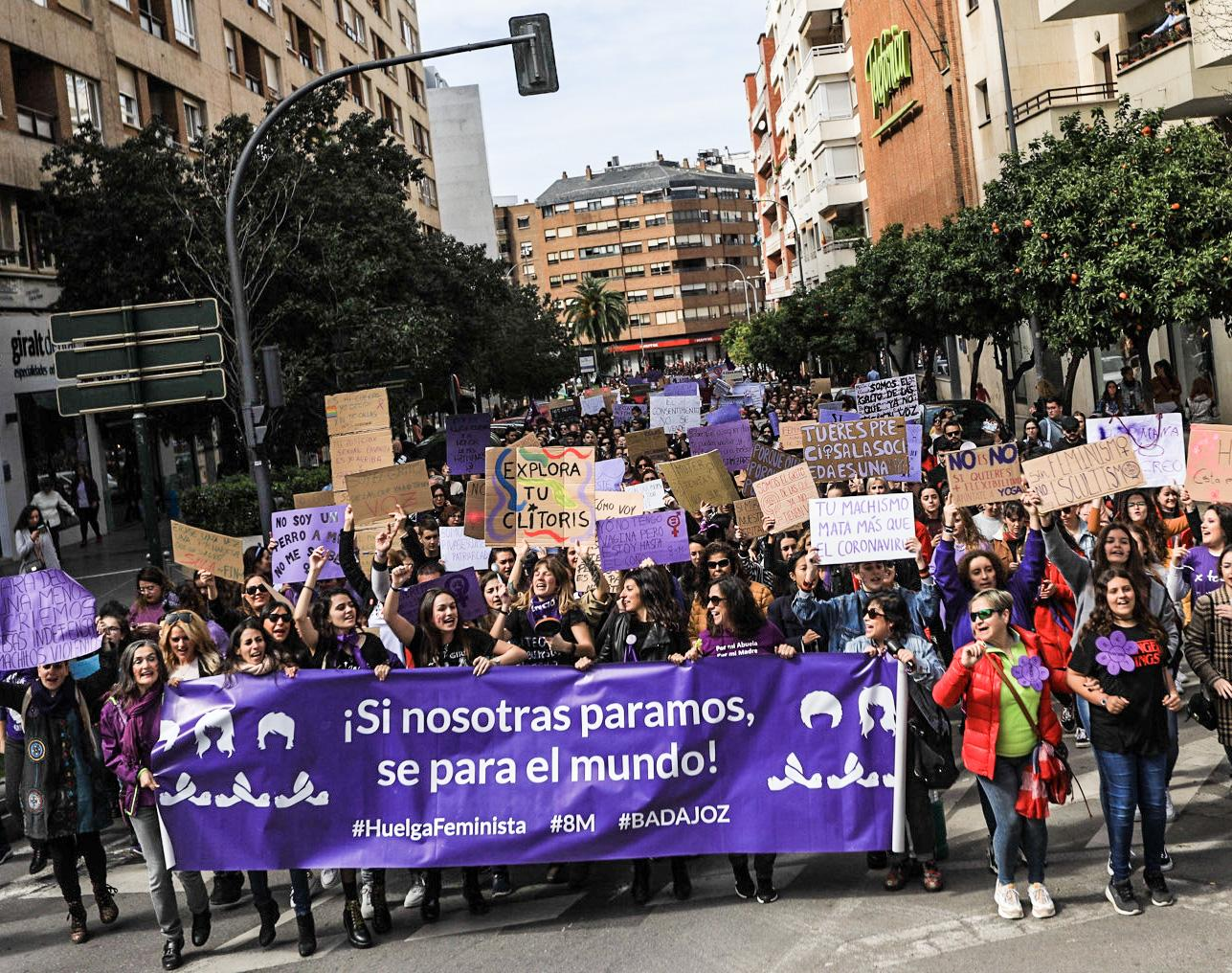
International Women's Day march in Mérida, Spain, 8 March

According to The Guardian, Spain's initially slow response to COVID-19 caused the epidemic to become severe even though it did not share a land border with Italy or other severely affected countries. An analysis in Vox hypothesised that the minority government did not want to risk its hold on power by banning large gatherings early; Prime Minister Pedro Sánchez initially defended his decision to allow large gatherings to continue.

==== Military exercises during pandemic ====
The planned NATO "Defender 2020" military exercise in Germany, Poland, and the Baltic states, the largest NATO war manoeuvres since the end of the Cold War, was to be held on a reduced scale because of the COVID-19 pandemic.

==== Restrictions on civil liberties ====
There was concern that measures taken by some national governments on occasion of the COVID-19 pandemic would have the aim or effect of restricting democracy and civil liberties and rights. In Hungary, prime minister Viktor Orbán acquired near absolute powers through such legislation on 3 April.

==== Use of scientific advice ====
The European Union's Chief Scientific Advisors issued a statement on 24 June 2020, providing guidance for how scientific advice should be given and interpreted during the pandemic. One key point made by the Advisors was that scientists must be clearer about the degree of uncertainty that characterises the evolving evidence on which their advice is based, for instance around the use of face-masks. They also emphasised that scientific advice must be separated from decision-making, and this separation must be made clear by politicians.

In April 2021, the leaders of the Society for Aerosol Research warned the debate on COVID-19 measures does not reflect current scientific knowledge. They said protection against infection must take place above all where people spend time indoors, because "the transmission of the SARS-CoV-2 viruses takes place almost without exception indoors."

=== Romani people ===
Romani people were hit hard by the pandemic.
