= John Mustapha Kutiyote =

South Sudanese human rights activist

- Born: December 1982 (age 43); Western Equatoria State Yambio, South Sudan
- Occupation: Human rights activist

John Mustapha Kutiyote is the co-founder and executive director of Students’ Organization for Liberty and Entrepreneurship, a think tank with the aim of promoting a free, peaceful, and prosperous South Sudan.

Kutiyote was born in December 1982 in Western Equatoria State Yambio, South Sudan.

== Life Journey ==
In 2014, John began his journey as a change maker when he joined the Students For Liberty (SFL) as a student in the African International University Kenya. Here he discovered his leadership abilities and started a chapter in his campus, where he also served as its head for over a year. After his return to South Sudan, he continued the work of promoting liberty principles through the SFL brand.

== Career ==
Kutiyote co‑founded SOLE, a registered think tank based in Western Equatoria, aiming to foster a free, peaceful, and prosperous society through civic education, entrepreneurship programs, and advocacy.

In August 2019, he won the Atlas Network’s Africa Think Tank Shark Tank award, securing US $5,000 for a project aimed at raising awareness about cultural discrimination that denies women property rights in South Sudan. The funds supported workshops, community meetings, and radio outreach in areas such as Yambio and Nzara. By late 2019, SOLE had reached approximately 350 women in workshops and many more via outreach campaigns aimed at promoting legal literacy and economic empowerment.

Under Kutiyote’s leadership, SOLE initiated a Stakeholders Training Program in 2022, targeting individuals in power to promote women’s legal rights to property ownership. SOLE has also implemented educational initiatives including radio shows and book-based community reading, featuring titles like The Adventures of Jonathan Gullible to teach free‑market principles and entrepreneurial skills.

Kutiyote has also served as a steering-committee member for the Bastiat Society (affiliated with the American Institute for Economic Research) chapter in South Sudan and held coordination roles with Students for Liberty and Foundation for Economic Education. He has also participated in global peacebuilding efforts with Mediators Beyond Borders International in South Sudan.
