= SecondStreet.org =

Canadian charity and think tank

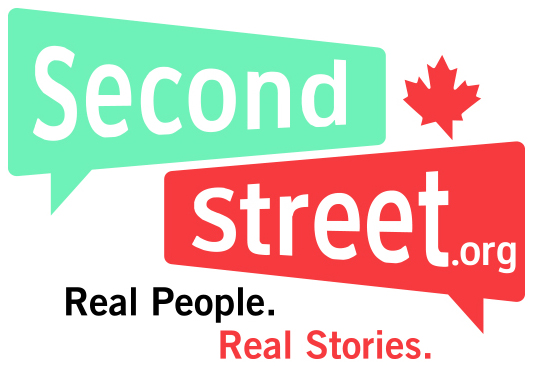
- Formation: 2019
- Type: Charitable organization: Advancement of Education
- Headquarters: Regina, Saskatchewan, Canada
- CEO: Troy Lanigan
- President: Colin Craig
- Website: https://secondstreet.org/

SecondStreet.org is a federally registered charitable organization and free-market public policy think tank in Canada.

The organization derives its name from "Second Street," the most common street name in Canada. SecondStreet.org aims to tell stories of how government policies affect "everyday Canadians".

Research by SecondStreet.org focuses on government policy, and includes the effectiveness of government operations (for example, as indicated by healthcare wait-times). SecondStreet.org communicates its findings through research reports, newspaper articles, media interviews, and videos.

SecondStreet.org is headquartered in Regina with staff and contributors based across Canada.

== Research ==
Research areas addressed by SecondStreet.org since its formation in 2019 include health care, natural resource development, education, and government red tape. In 2023, SecondStreet.org had 33 columns published in Canadian media outlets, its staff gave 67 television and radio interviews, and it produced 60 videos and a national television show (On Second Street). During its first five years, the organization produced 42 research reports, and its social media channels were viewed 14 million times.

An area of focus for SecondStreet.org has been healthcare wait-times. A study that used data from provincial governments and the Canadian Medical Association Journal showed 353,913 surgeries, procedures, and specialist consultations were postponed across Canada due to COVID-19 in the first few months of the pandemic. Later research employed information requests to provincial health authorities and found 3.1 million Canadians were on provincial waiting lists for surgery, diagnostic scans, or to see a specialist, and more than 17,000 patients died while on waiting lists, in the year ending March 2023. They also found that in 2017 more than 217,500 Candanians left the country to have health care procedures performed.

In a study of government operations, SecondStreet.org found many hospital-run restaurants in Canada lose money, and hospitals could, instead, earn revenue by renting the restaurant space to food-selling businesses. The Alberta Minister of Health press secretary said "The SecondStreet.org findings fit with the evidence" and "We need to find efficiencies in the health system to pay for more services for patients".

== Political stance and affiliations ==
A CTV News story described SecondStreet.org as a "conservative-leaning public policy think tank". SecondStreet.org says it "has tended to approach public policy issues from a free market perspective." The organization is a member of the Canada Strong and Free Network (formerly the Manning Centre).

== Administration ==
SecondStreet.org was launched in February 2019. In 2023, the organization's volunteer board of directors consisted of Scott Hennig, Tracy Johnson, Steven Muchnik, Walter Robinson, and Board Chair C.C. (Kip) Woodward. Colin Craig is the President, and Troy Lanigan the Founder & CEO (Managing Director).

== See also ==
- Canada Strong and Free Network (formerly the Manning Centre)
- Canadian Taxpayers Federation
- Fraser Institute
