= International Journal of Health Planning and Management =

Quarterly peer-reviewed journal

- Discipline: Health policy
- Language: English
- Edited by: Tiago Correia

Publication details
- History: 1985–present
- Publisher: John Wiley & Sons
- Frequency: Quarterly
- Impact factor: 2.298 (2021)

Standard abbreviations
- ISO 4: Int. J. Health Plan. Manag.
- NLM: Int J Health Plann Manage

Indexing
- CODEN: IJHMEO
- ISSN: 0749-6753 (print); 1099-1751 (web)
- LCCN: sn84006997
- OCLC no.: 936520469

Links
- Journal homepage; Online access; Online archive

The International Journal of Health Planning and Management is a quarterly peer-reviewed scientific journal covering health policy. It was established in 1985 and is published by John Wiley & Sons. The editor-in-chief is Tiago Correia (NOVA University Lisbon). According to the Journal Citation Reports, the journal has a 2021 impact factor of 2.298, ranking it 60th out of 88 journals in the category "Health Policy & Services".
