= International aid related to the COVID-19 pandemic =

Due to its severity, the COVID-19 pandemic has caused countries to send aid, as part of the international responses and management regarding the pandemic. Types of materials aided includes (but are not limited to) masks, medical supplies, personal protective equipment, money, and test kits. It started with aid to China as the virus spreads primarily there, and then internationally as it spreads globally. The destination of the aid ranges from hospitals, COVID-19 healthcare workers, research on the vaccine, to societies vulnerable. People donating includes the government of said country, notable people, organizations and institutions, charities, as well as regular people.

== Aid to China ==
=== Receive ===
Some Chinese students at American universities sent aid, including 50,000 N95 masks on 30 January. The humanitarian aid organization Direct Relief sent 200,000 face masks and other personal protective equipment to the Wuhan Union Hospital the same day. On 5 February, the Chinese foreign ministry said 21 countries (including Belarus, Pakistan, Trinidad and Tobago, Egypt, and Iran) had sent aid to China, as well as Bill and Melinda Gates announcing a $100 million donation to the WHO to fund vaccine research and treatment efforts and protect "at-risk populations in Africa and South Asia." Interaksyon said the Chinese government had donated 200,000 masks to the Philippines on 6 February after Philippine senator Richard Gordon shipped 3.16 million masks to Wuhan. On 19 February, the Singapore Red Cross announced it would send $2.26 million worth of aid to China.

Several countries donated masks, medical equipment or money to China, including Japan, Turkey, Russia, Malaysia, Germany, and Canada. The U.S. State Department said on 7 February it had facilitated the transportation of nearly 17.8 tons of medical supplies to China. The same day, U.S. Secretary of State Pompeo announced a $100 million pledge to China and other countries to aid their fights against the virus, though on 21 March China said it had not received epidemic funding from the U.S. government and reiterated that on 3 April. Several corporations have also donated money or medical equipment to China.

=== Sent ===
China also aided the things needed as other countries have the virus spread faster and their country's graphs lowered. They, along with Cuba and Russia, sent experts and medical equipment to Italy in order to fight their virus outbreak, with China sending three medical teams and donated more than forty tons of medical supplies to Italy. Businessman Jack Ma sent 1.1 million testing kits, 6 million face masks, and 60,000 protective suits to Ethiopia for distribution by the African Union. He later sent 5,000 testing kits, 100,000 face masks and 5 ventilators to Panama. However, in August 2020, a corruption scandal emerged over Ma's medical donations to Africa.

== Aid to other parts of the world ==
=== Abkhazia ===
Russia supplied some 500 COVID-19 test kits and sent soldiers to Abkhazia to support disinfection of public places.

=== Afghanistan ===
On March 14, Beijing says that they will be helping Afghanistan, However, it was later reported that China's medical equipment were not up to standard and put Afghanistan's fight against COVID-19 at risk. The United Arab Emirates also sent aid, and arrived the day before China's aid arrived. Uzbekistan announced that they would send aid for the five northern provinces of Afghanistan. Several countries, as well as the European Union, proceeded sending aid. The World Bank, Asian Development Bank, and World Health Organization says that they would be helping. Oppositely, Afghanistan contributed $1 million to the South Asian Association for Regional Cooperation (SAARC) emergency fund.

=== Bulgaria ===
The Bulgarian government is looking into import opportunities of chloroquine from China, however exports of all quinine-based drugs were prohibited until further notice, and 35,000 doses of quinine-based Analgin for export have been diverted for domestic consumption. The government then negotiated the delivery of 171,429 packs of hydroxychloroquine sulfate and 30,000 packs of azithromycin from the China National Pharmaceutical Group. The shipment was delivered; the cargo also included more than 1,600,000 masks and 50 ventilators.

=== Cambodia ===
On 23 March, a team of seven specialist physicians from southern China's Guangxi with medical supplies, including ventilators, medical masks, protective suits, test kits, and infrared temperature sensors, had landed in Phnom Penh to assist tackling the pandemic. In April 2020, Vietnam donated Cambodia with $100,000 worth of medical supplies.

=== Cuba ===
Cuba, along with Russia and China, sent medical supplies and experts to Italy to deal with its coronavirus outbreak.

=== Czech Republic ===
The Czech Republic, along with the Netherlands, Spain, Turkey and Georgia expressed concerns over Chinese-made masks and test kits, which has been aided to several countries like Afghanistan.

=== Eriteria ===
Diaspora communities have been sending large volumes of money to support relief efforts in the country. For example, Eritrean Americans have sent at least US$4 million, according to the US embassy in Eritrea.

=== Greece ===
The Hellenic Ministry of Health formed a 3-member committee responsible for the review and employment of all the donations in support of the National Healthcare System during the COVID-19 pandemic. On 7 May, Health Minister Vasilis Kikilias announced that donations worth about 90 million euros came from organizations, companies and individuals, as well as other states such as China and the United Arab Emirates. 40 million euros were for medical equipment (ICU monitors, ventilators, ICU beds), another 24.2 million euros were for personal protective equipment (face masks, surgical aprons, protective uniforms, medical οvershoes) and there were another 12.5 million euros in cash deposits.

=== Grenada ===
As part of preventing wide spread of the virus in its country, testing such as antibody tests were made available by the help of St. George's University and Venezuela, making prime minister of Grenada Keith Mitchell confident on future projections showing low numbers of cases. However, the wish did not came true when a new patient (codenamed Case 15) was tested positive for the virus, and was confirmed to be part of a community spread days later

Due to the pandemic, Grenada also faces an economy drop. On March 20, 2020, the government announced a stimulus package to provide income support to small businesses, suspension of various taxes, and unemployment benefits to eligible citizens, which took about a month to fully roll out, which were a rapid loan of US$22.4 million from the IMF, in a package aimed at the Eastern Caribbean countries of Dominica, Grenada, and St. Lucia.

=== Indonesia ===
President Joko Widodo asked the United States for medical equipment, including ventilators via phone call to President Donald Trump, to which President Trump, on April 24, responded he will provide and also reiterated the intent to strengthen economic cooperation between the two.

=== Italy ===
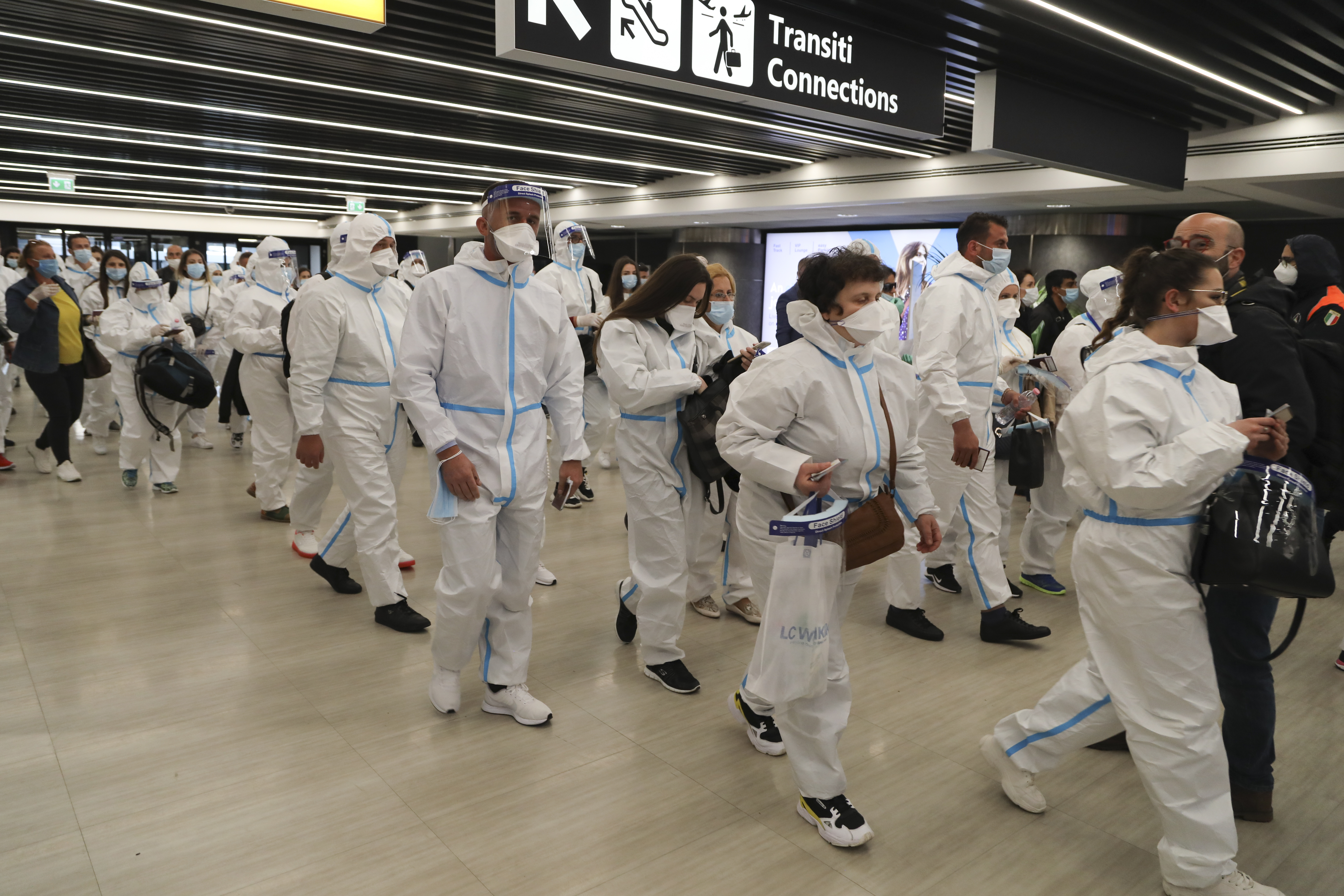
Albanian physicians arrive in Fiumicino Airport in Rome in April 2020

=== Russia ===
Russia is one of the several countries to send aid to China during its peak of outbreak. It also helped Italy along with Cuba and China in the midst of their peak of outbreak.

=== Vietnam ===
The Vietnamese community in the Ústí nad Labem region raised CZK 140,000 for a donation of a ventilator to a hospital in Ústí nad Labem.

=== United Arab Emirates ===
The UAE began production of Hayat-Vax, a locally manufactured version of China's Sinopharm BIBP vaccine, in March 2021. Plans included the production of 2 million doses per month, a majority of which would be exported to low-income countries, particularly Africa and the Middle East, under the WHO's COVAX scheme. The UAE government's goals for producing the vaccine locally included building vaccine confidence.

== See also ==
- COVID-19 pandemic by country and territory
- National response to the COVID-19 pandemic
