= National responses to the COVID-19 pandemic =

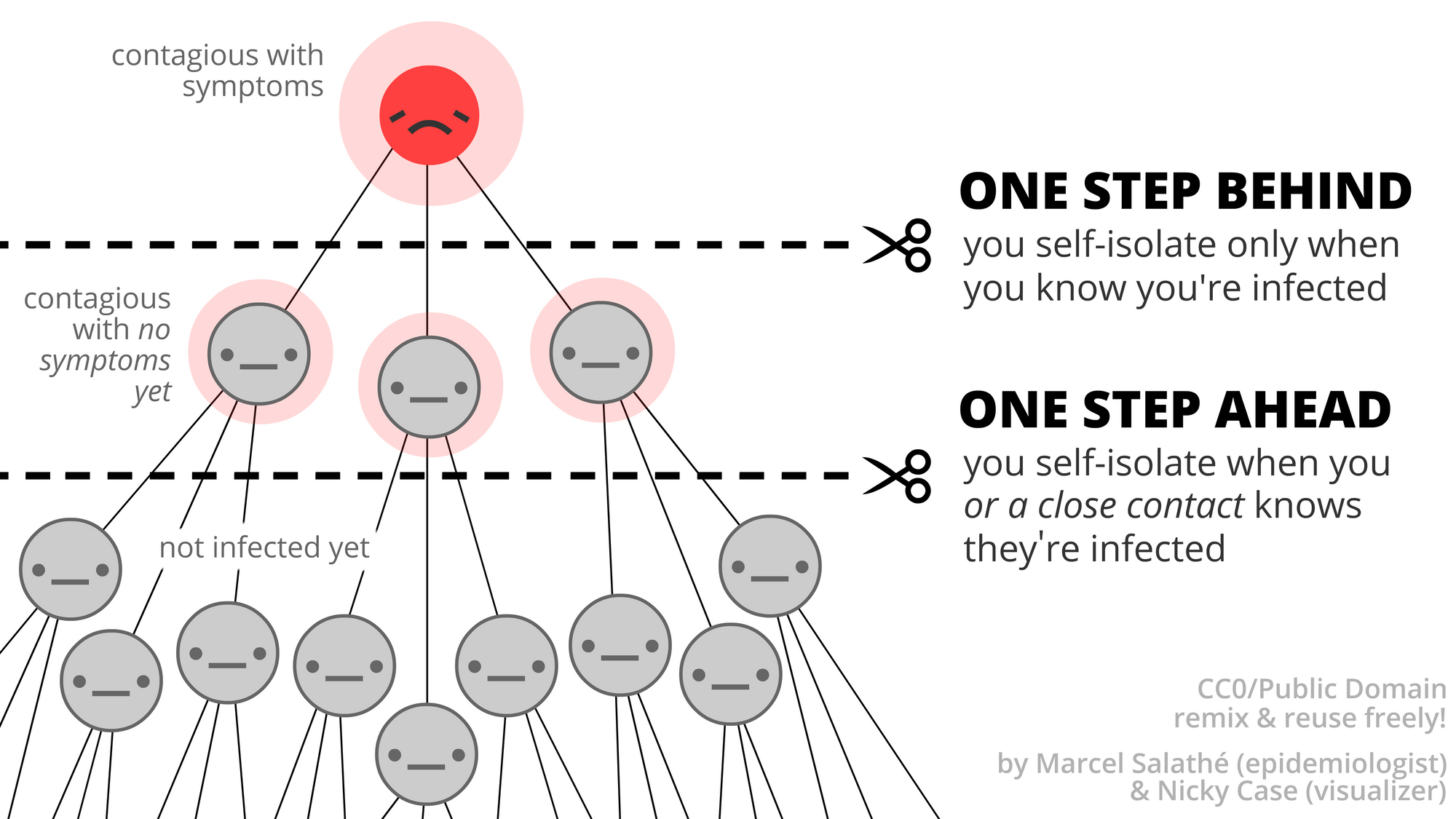
Illustration showing how COVID-19 spreads and the impact of isolation on it

National responses to the COVID-19 pandemic have been varied, and have included containment measures such as lockdowns, quarantines, and curfews. As of 5 November 2026, 779,452,126 cases of COVID-19 have been reported, resulting in 7,117,473 reported deaths. The most affected countries in terms of confirmed cases are the United States, Brazil, India, Russia, South Africa, Peru, Mexico, Chile, the United Kingdom, and Iran.

== Lockdowns ==
COVID-19 pandemic lockdowns
Country / territory	Place	First lockdown			Second lockdown			Third lockdown			Fourth lockdown			Fifth lockdown			Sixth lockdown			Seventh lockdown			Eighth lockdown			Total length (days)	Level
Country / territory	Place	Start date	End date	Length (days)	Start date	End date	Length (days)	Start date	End date	Length (days)	Start date	End date	Length (days)	Start date	End date	Length (days)	Start date	End date	Length (days)	Start date	End date	Length (days)	Start date	End date	Length (days)	Total length (days)	Level
Albania		2020-03-13	2020-06-01	80																						80	National
Algeria	Algiers	2020-03-23	2020-05-14	52																						52	City
Algeria	Blida	2020-03-23	2020-05-14	52																						52	City
Argentina	Greater Buenos Aires	2020-03-19	2020-11-08	234	2021-05-22	2021-05-30	9	2021-06-05	2021-06-06	2																245	Metropolitan area
Argentina	Rest of the country	2020-03-19	2020-05-10	52	2021-05-22	2021-05-30	9	2021-06-05	2021-06-06	2																63	National
Armenia		2020-03-24	2020-05-04	41																						41	National
Australia	Melbourne	2020-03-31	2020-05-12 (Note: Restrictions were further eased on 1 June 2021, however during the time between then and 12 May 2021, "Stay at home orders" were not active and hence this period didn't constitute what is internationally considered a "lockdown".)	43	2020-07-09 (Note: Stage 3 lockdown imposed on 8 July; Stage 4 lockdown imposed on 2 August 2020)	2020-10-27	111	2021-02-13	2021-02-17	5	2021-05-28	2021-06-10	14	2021-07-16	2021-07-27	12	2021-08-05	2021-10-21	78							263	Metropolitan area
Australia	Greater Shepparton	2020-03-31	2020-05-12	43	2020-08-06	2020-09-16	41	2021-02-13	2021-02-17	5	2021-05-28	2021-06-03	7	2021-07-16	2021-07-27	12	2021-08-05	2021-08-09	5	2021-08-21	2021-09-15	25	2021-10-02	2021-10-09	7	145	Local government area
Australia	Ballarat	2020-03-31	2020-05-12	43	2020-08-06	2020-09-16	41	2021-02-13	2021-02-17	5	2021-05-28	2021-06-03	7	2021-07-16	2021-07-27	12	2021-08-05	2021-08-09	5	2021-08-21	2021-09-09	20	2021-09-16	2021-09-22 (Note: End-date of lockdown is subject to the vaccine rollout. Restrictions are set to be eased when 70% of the eligible population has been vaccinated)	7	140	Local government area
Australia	Greater Geelong	2020-03-31	2020-05-12	43	2020-08-06	2020-09-16	41	2021-02-13	2021-02-17	5	2021-05-28	2021-06-03	7	2021-07-16	2021-07-27	12	2021-08-05	2021-08-09	5	2021-08-21	2021-09-09	20	2021-09-20	2021-09-26	7	140	Local government area
Australia	Surf Coast Shire	2020-03-31	2020-05-12	43	2020-08-06	2020-09-16	41	2021-02-13	2021-02-17	5	2021-05-28	2021-06-03	7	2021-07-16	2021-07-27	12	2021-08-05	2021-08-09	5	2021-08-21	2021-09-09	20	2021-09-20	2021-09-26	7	140	Local government area
Australia	Mitchell Shire	2020-03-31	2020-05-12	43	2020-07-09	2020-09-16	70	2021-02-13	2021-02-17	5	2021-05-28	2021-06-03	7	2021-07-16	2021-07-27	12	2021-08-05	2021-08-09	5	2021-08-21	2021-09-09	20	2021-09-20	2021-10-13 (Note: End-date of lockdown is subject to the vaccine rollout. Restrictions are set to be eased when 70% of the eligible population has been vaccinated)	24	186	Local government area
Australia	Mildura	2020-03-31	2020-05-12	43	2020-08-06	2020-09-16	41	2021-02-13	2021-02-17	5	2021-05-28	2021-06-03	7	2021-07-16	2021-07-27	12	2021-08-05	2021-08-09	5	2021-08-21	2021-09-09	20	2021-10-09	2021-10-22	14	147	Local government area
Australia	Latrobe Valley	2020-03-31	2020-05-12	43	2020-08-06	2020-09-16	41	2021-02-13	2021-02-17	5	2021-05-28	2021-06-03	7	2021-07-16	2021-07-27	12	2021-08-05	2021-08-09	5	2021-08-21	2021-09-09	20	2021-09-29	2021-10-06	7	140	Region
Australia	Rest of regional Victoria (Note: All of Victoria except Melbourne, Greater Shepparton, Ballarat, Greater Geelong, Surf Coast Shire and Mitchell Shire)	2020-03-31	2020-05-12	43	2020-08-06	2020-09-16	41	2021-02-13	2021-02-17	5	2021-05-28	2021-06-03	7	2021-07-16	2021-07-27	12	2021-08-05	2021-08-09	5	2021-08-21	2021-09-09	20				133	State
Australia	South Australia				2020-11-19	2020-11-22	3	2021-07-21	2021-07-27	7																62	State
Australia	Southern Tasmania				2021-10-16	2021-10-19	3																			55	State
Australia	Northern Beaches (NSW)				2020-12-19	2021-01-10	22	2021-06-26	2021-10-11 (Note: End-date of lockdown is subject to the vaccine rollout or 0 cases for 14 days. Restrictions are set to be eased when 70% of the eligible population has been vaccinated)	107																181	Local government area
Australia	Brisbane				2021-01-08	2021-01-11	3	2021-03-29	2021-04-01	3	2021-06-29	2021-07-03	4	2021-07-31	2021-08-08	8										67	Metropolitan area
Australia	Perth				2021-01-31	2021-02-05	5	2021-04-23	2021-04-26	3	2021-06-28	2021-07-02	4													61	Metropolitan area
Australia	Peel				2021-01-31	2021-02-05	5	2021-04-23	2021-04-26	3	2021-06-28	2021-07-02	4													61	Region
Australia	South West				2021-01-31	2021-02-05	5																			57	Region
Australia	Illawarra				2021-06-26	2021-10-11 (Note: End-date of lockdown is subject to the vaccine rollout or 0 cases for 14 days. Restrictions are set to be eased when 70% of the eligible population has been vaccinated)	107																			159	Region
Australia	Greater Sydney				2021-06-26	2021-10-11 (Note: End-date of lockdown is subject to the vaccine rollout or 0 cases for 14 days. Restrictions are set to be eased when 70% of the eligible population has been vaccinated)	107																			159	Metropolitan area
Australia	Darwin				2021-06-27	2021-07-02	5	2021-08-16	2021-08-19	3																57	Metropolitan area
Australia	South East Queensland				2021-06-29	2021-07-02	3	2021-07-31	2021-08-08	8																63	Region
Australia	Townsville				2021-06-29	2021-07-02	3	2021-07-31	2021-08-08	8																63	Metropolitan area
Australia	Alice Springs				2021-06-30	2021-07-03	3																			55	Metropolitan area
Australia	Central West				2021-07-20	2021-07-27	7	2021-08-14	2021-10-11 (Note: End-date of lockdown is subject to the vaccine rollout or 0 cases for 14 days. Restrictions are set to be eased when 70% of the eligible population has been vaccinated)	58																117	Region
Australia	Hunter Valley				2021-08-05	2021-10-11 (Note: End-date of lockdown is subject to the vaccine rollout or 0 cases for 14 days. Restrictions are set to be eased when 70% of the eligible population has been vaccinated)	67																			119	Region
Australia	Upper Hunter				2021-08-05	2021-09-16 (Note: End-date of lockdown is subject to the vaccine rollout or 0 cases for 14 days. Restrictions are set to be eased when 70% of the eligible population has been vaccinated)	42																			94	Region
Australia	Muswellbrook				2021-08-05	2021-09-16 (Note: End-date of lockdown is subject to the vaccine rollout or 0 cases for 14 days. Restrictions are set to be eased when 70% of the eligible population has been vaccinated)	42	2021-09-28	2021-10-11 (Note: End-date of lockdown is subject to the vaccine rollout or 0 cases for 14 days. Restrictions are set to be eased when 70% of the eligible population has been vaccinated)	13																107	Local government area
Australia	Armidale				2021-08-07	2021-09-10	34																			87	Local government area
Australia	Cairns Region				2021-08-08	2021-08-11	3																			55	Region
Australia	Yarrabah				2021-08-08	2021-08-11	3																			55	Local government area
Australia	Richmond Valley				2021-08-09	2021-09-10	32																			84	Local government area
Australia	Lismore				2021-08-09	2021-09-10	32	2021-09-16	2021-09-23	7	2021-10-03	2021-10-11	8													99	Local government area
Australia	Byron Shire				2021-08-09	2021-09-10	32	2021-09-21	2021-09-28	7																91	Local government area
Australia	Ballina				2021-08-09	2021-09-10	32																			84	Local government area
Australia	Tamworth				2021-08-09	2021-09-10	32																			84	Local government area
Australia	Dubbo				2021-08-11	2021-10-11 (Note: End-date of lockdown is subject to the vaccine rollout or 0 cases for 14 days. Restrictions are set to be eased when 70% of the eligible population has been vaccinated)	61																			113	Local government area
Australia	Australian Capital Territory				2021-08-12	2021-10-15	61																			114	Territory
Australia	Regional NSW (Note: Applies for all others Regional NSW outside Greater Sydney, Hunter Region, Dubbo, Central West, South Coast, Goulburn, Queanbeyan-Palerang and Snowy Monaro)				2021-08-14	2021-09-10	28																			81	Region
Australia	Mid-Coast				2021-08-14	2021-09-10	28																			81	Local government area
Australia	South Coast (Note: Applies for all South Coast except Bega Valley after 16/09/2021)				2021-08-14	2021-10-11 (Note: End-date of lockdown is subject to the vaccine rollout or 0 cases for 14 days. Restrictions are set to be eased when 70% of the eligible population has been vaccinated)	57																			109	Region
Australia	Bega Valley				2021-08-14	2021-09-16 (Note: End-date of lockdown is subject to the vaccine rollout or 0 cases for 14 days. Restrictions are set to be eased when 70% of the eligible population has been vaccinated)	33																			85	Local government area
Australia	Goulburn–Mulwaree				2021-08-14	2021-10-11 (Note: End-date of lockdown is subject to the vaccine rollout or 0 cases for 14 days. Restrictions are set to be eased when 70% of the eligible population has been vaccinated)	57																			109	Local government area
Australia	Snowy Monaro				2021-08-14	2021-09-16 (Note: End-date of lockdown is subject to the vaccine rollout or 0 cases for 14 days. Restrictions are set to be eased when 70% of the eligible population has been vaccinated)	33	2021-09-30	2021-10-11	11																96	Local government area
Australia	Yass Valley				2021-08-14	2021-09-10	28	2021-09-14	2021-09-27	14																94	Local government area
Australia	Albury (NSW)				2021-08-14	2021-09-10	28	2021-09-16	2021-09-23	7																87	Local government area
Australia	Cowra				2021-08-14	2021-09-10	28	2021-09-20	2021-10-05	14																94	Local government area
Australia	Glen Innes Severn (NSW)				2021-08-14	2021-09-10	28	2021-09-17	2021-09-24	7																87	Local government area
Australia	Hilltops (NSW)				2021-08-14	2021-09-10	28	2021-09-17	2021-10-01	14																94	Local government area
Australia	Port Macquarie-Hastings				2021-08-14	2021-09-10	28	2021-09-28	2021-10-05	7																87	Local government area
Australia	Oberon				2021-08-14	2021-09-10	28	2021-09-29	2021-10-11	12																92	Local government area
Australia	Gunnedah				2021-08-14	2021-09-10	28	2021-10-05	2021-10-11	6																86	Local government area
Australia	Casino				2021-08-14	2021-09-10	28	2021-10-02	2021-10-11	9																89	Town
Australia	Rest of the country (Note: Applies for further measures in each Australian state and territory)	2020-03-23	2020-05-15	52																						52	National
Austria		2020-03-16	2020-04-13	28	2020-11-03	2020-11-30	27	2020-12-26	2021-02-07	43	2021-11-22	2021-12-11	20													118	National
Azerbaijan		2020-03-31	2020-08-30	152																						152	National
Bangladesh		2020-03-26	2020-05-16	51	2021-04-05	2021-07-14	100	2021-07-23	2021-08-10	18																169	National
Barbados		2020-03-28	2020-05-03	36																						36	National
Belgium		2020-03-18	2020-05-04	47	2020-11-02	2020-12-14	42	2021-03-27	2021-04-26	30																119	National
Bermuda		2020-04-04	2020-05-02	28																						28	National
Bhutan		2020-08-11	2020-09-01	21																						21	National
Bolivia		2020-03-22	2020-07-31	131																						131	National
Botswana		2020-04-02	2020-04-30	28																						28	National
Brazil	Santa Catarina	2020-03-17	2020-04-07	21																						21	State
Brazil	São Paulo	2020-03-24	2020-05-10	47																						47	State
Bulgaria		2020-03-13 (Note: Initially to last until 13 April 2020, included closures of universities, schools, restaurants and other establishments, a ban on mass gatherings, suspension of sports competitions for more than two months, certain temporary restrictions on the free movement of citizens, but no strict "Stay at home order". A number of lockdown measures were already eased or lifted in April and May 2020.)	2020-06-15 (Note: Depending on the strictness of the definition for a lockdown; some sources such as Politico Europe consider it to have ended by 9 May, with a total duration of 57 days.)	94	2020-11-28 (de facto) (Note: Closures of all educational institutions, restaurants and other establishments, a ban on most cultural events, all excursions and forms of group tourism, children forbidden to participate in organized sports events, no "Stay at home order", described as a "soft" or "partial" lockdown and officially entered into force at 23:30 on 27 November.)	2021-01-31 (Note: The lockdown was initially to end on 21 December 2020, but was subsequently extended until 31 January 2021, though with a few of the restrictions relaxed, such as children in kindergartens and in grades 1-4 being able to attend in-person classes from January 2021.)	65	2021-03-22 (Note: Preceded by some measures on the regional level, no "Stay at home order".)	2021-03-31	10																169	National
Cambodia	Phnom Penh	2021-04-15	2021-05-05	21																						21	Municipality
Cambodia	Ta Khmau	2021-04-15	2021-05-05	21																						21	Municipality
Canada	British Columbia	2020-03-18	2020-05-18	61	2020-11-07	2021-01-08	62																			123	Province
Canada	Ontario	2020-03-17	2020-05-14	58				2021-04-03	2021-05-01	28																86	Province
Canada	Ontario - South				2020-12-26	2021-01-23	28	2021-04-08	2021-06-02	55																83	Region
Canada	Ontario - North				2020-12-26	2021-01-09	14																			14	Region
Canada	Quebec	2020-03-18	2020-05-04	47	2020-12-25	2021-01-11	18																			65	Province
Colombia		2020-03-25	2020-06-30	97																						97	National
Congo		2020-03-31	2020-04-20	20																						20	National
Costa Rica		2020-03-23	2020-05-01	39																						39	National
Croatia		2020-03-18	2020-05-11	32	2020-12-22	2020-12-29	7																			39	National
Cyprus		2020-03-24	2020-04-13	20	2021-01-10	2021-01-31	21	2021-04-26	2021-05-09	13																54	National
Czech Republic		2020-03-16	2020-04-12	27	2020-10-22	2021-03-28	174																			201	National
Denmark		2020-03-12	2020-04-13	33	2020-12-25	2021-03-01	66																			99	National
Ecuador		2020-03-16	2020-03-31	15																						15	National
El Salvador		2020-03-12	2020-04-02	21																						21	National
Eritrea		2020-04-02	2020-04-23	21																						21	National
Estonia		2021-03-11	2021-04-11	31																						31	National
Fiji	Lautoka	2020-03-20	2020-04-07	18	2021-04-19																					18	City
Fiji	Suva	2020-04-03	2020-04-17	14																						14	City
France	Nationwide	2020-03-17	2020-05-11	55	2020-10-30	2020-12-15	46	2021-04-04	2021-05-03	29																130	National
France	Paris			55			46	2021-03-19	2021-04-18	30																131	Region
Finland		2021-03-08	2021-03-28	20																						20	National
Georgia		2020-03-31	2020-04-21	21																						21	National
Germany	different regionally	2020-03-16 (Note: Lockdown was started in Freiburg, Baden-Württemberg and Bavaria on 20 March 2020. Two days later, it was expanded to the whole of Germany)	2020-05-30 to 2020-05-11	76	2020-11-02	2021-03-01 to 2021-06-11	119 to 222																			179 to 298	National
Germany	Berchtesgadener Land			76	2020-10-20	2020-11-03	14																			43 to 64	District
Ghana	Accra	2020-03-30	2020-04-12	13																						13	Metropolitan area
Ghana	Kumasi	2020-03-30	2020-04-12	13																						13	Metropolitan area
Greece	Nationwide	2020-03-23	2020-05-04	42	2020-11-07	2021-03-22	135																			177	National
Greece	Thessaloniki			42	2020-11-03	2021-03-22	139																			181	Regional unit
Greece	Serres			42	2020-11-03	2021-03-22	139																			181	Regional unit
Guernsey		2020-03-25	2020-06-20	87	2021-01-23	2021-02-22	30																			117	National
Honduras		2020-03-20	2020-05-17	58																						58	National
Hungary		2020-03-28	2020-04-10	13																						13	National
India	Nationwide	2020-03-25	2020-06-07	74																						74	National
India	Bengaluru				2021-04-27	2021-05-09	12																			12	Region
India	Delhi				2021-04-19	2021-05-31	42																			42	Region
India	Haryana				2021-05-03	2021-05-10	7																			7	State
India	Maharashtra				2021-04-14	2021-06-15	62																			62	State
India	Odisha				2021-05-05	2021-05-19	14																			14	State
India	Rajasthan				2021-05-10	2021-06-08	29																			29	State
India	Uttar Pradesh				2021-04-30	2021-05-10	10																			10	State
Iran		2020-03-14	2020-04-20	37	2021-04-14	2021-04-24	14																			47	National
Iraq		2020-03-22	2020-04-11	20																						20	National
Ireland	All 26 counties	2020-03-12 (Note: A national stay-at-home order was officially declared on 27 March)	2020-05-18	67	2020-10-21	2020-12-01	41	2020-12-24 (Note: A full third lockdown was declared from 30 December and was repeatedly extended.)	2021-04-12	119																227	National
Ireland	Kildare	2020-08-07	2020-08-31	24																						24	Regional
Ireland	Laois	2020-08-07	2020-08-21	14																						14	Regional
Ireland	Offaly	2020-08-07	2020-08-21	14																						14	Regional
Israel	Bnei Brak	2020-04-02	2020-04-16	14			30			42																86	City
Israel	Nationwide				2020-09-18	2020-10-18	30	2020-12-27	2021-02-07	42																72	National
Italy	Nationwide	2020-03-09 (Note: Lockdown was first started in Northern Italy on 8 March 2020, then expanded to the rest of Italy the following day)	2020-05-18	70	2020-12-24 (Note: The lockdown was suspended on 28, 29, 30 December 2020 and 4 January 2021)	2021-01-06	13	2021-03-15	2021-04-30	46																129	National
Italy	Lombardy			70	2020-11-06	2020-12-03	27	2021-01-17	2021-01-30	13																110	Region
Italy	Piedmont			70	2020-11-06	2020-12-03	27																			97	Region
Italy	Aosta Valley			70	2020-11-06	2020-12-03	27																			97	Region
Italy	Calabria			70	2020-11-06	2020-12-03	27																			97	Region
Italy	Sicily			70				2021-01-17	2021-01-30	13																83	Region
Italy	Province of Bolzano			70				2021-01-17	2021-01-30	13																83	Province
Jamaica	Saint Catherine	2020-04-15	2020-04-22	7																						7	Parish
Jordan		2020-03-18	2020-04-30	43	2020-11-10	2020-11-15	5																			48	National
Kosovo		2020-03-14	2020-05-04	51																						51	National
Kuwait		2020-05-10	2020-05-31	21																						21	National
Lebanon		2020-03-15	2020-03-28	13	2020-11-14	2020-11-28	14																			27	National
Libya		2020-03-22	2020-06-27	97																						97	National
Lithuania		2020-03-16	2020-06-18	94	2020-11-07	2020-11-28	21																			115	National
Madagascar	Antananarivo	2020-03-23	2020-04-20	28																						28	City
Madagascar	Toamasina	2020-03-23	2020-04-20	28																						28	City
Malaysia		2020-03-18	2020-06-09	83	2021-01-13	2021-02-10	28	2021-06-01	2021-08-16	76																187	National
Mexico	Nationwide	2020-03-23	2020-06-01	70																						70	National
Mexico	Chihuahua			70	2020-10-23	2020-12-06	44																			114	State
Mexico	Durango			70	2020-11-03	2020-12-06	33																			103	State
Mexico	Baja California			70	2020-12-07																					70	State
Mexico	Mexico City			70	2020-12-19																					70	State
Mexico	State of Mexico			70	2020-12-19																					70	State
Mexico	Morelos			70	2021-01-04																					70	State
Mexico	Guanajuato			70	2021-01-04																					70	State
Mongolia		2020-03-10	2020-03-16	6	2020-11-17	2020-12-01	15																			21	National
Montenegro	Tuzi	2020-03-24	2020-05-05	42																						42	Municipality
Morocco		2020-03-19	2020-06-10	83																						83	National
Myanmar	Yangon	2020-04-18	2020-07-01	74	2020-09-01	2021-04-10	220	2021-07-08	2021-10-27	111																405	City
Namibia		2020-03-27 (Note: Lockdown was started in the regions of Erongo and Khomas but effectively enforced countrywide. On 14 April the lockdown was extended to 4 May and to all of Namibia.)	2020-05-04	38																						38	
Nepal	Nationwide	2020-03-24	2020-07-21	120																						120	
Nepal	Kathmandu			120	2020-08-20	2020-09-09	21																			141	City
Netherlands		2020-03-15	2020-04-06	22	2020-12-15	2021-06-05	172	2021-12-19	2022-01-14	26																220	National
New Zealand	Nationwide	2020-03-23	2020-05-13	52	2021-08-18	2021-09-07	21																			73	National
New Zealand	Auckland			52	2020-08-12	2020-08-30	19	2021-02-14	2021-02-17	3	2021-02-28	2021-03-07	7	2021-08-18	2021-11-29(TBC)	104										185	Region
Nigeria	Abuja	2020-03-30	2020-04-12	13																						13	City
Nigeria	Lagos	2020-03-30	2020-04-12	13																						13	City
Nigeria	Ogun	2020-03-30	2020-04-12	13																						13	State
Northern Cyprus		2020-03-30	2020-05-04	35																						35	National
North Korea	Nationwide	2022-05-12	not set	not set																							National
North Korea	Kaesong	2020-07-25	2020-08-14	20																						20	City
Oman	Muscat	2020-04-10	2020-05-29	49																						49	Governorate
Oman	Jalan Bani Bu Ali	2020-04-16	2020-05-29	43																						43	Province
Pakistan		2020-03-24	2020-05-09	46	2021-05-08	2021-05-18	10																			46	National
Panama		2020-03-25	2020-05-31 (downgraded to a night and weekend curfew)	67																						67	National
Papua New Guinea		2020-03-24	2020-04-07	14																						14	National
Paraguay		2020-03-20	2020-05-03	44																						44	National
Peru		2020-03-16	2020-06-30	106																						106	National
Philippines	Cebu	2020-03-27	2020-05-15 (Note: Except in Cebu City only where it was extended to 16 days) to 2020-05-31 (Note: Lockdown was extended to areas under high risk COVID-19 zones)	49 to 65																						49 to 65	Province
Philippines	Davao Region	2020-03-19	2020-05-15	57																						57	Region
Philippines	Luzon	2020-03-15 (Note: Lockdown was started in Metro Manila, but expanded to the rest of Luzon two days later, 17 March 2020)	2020-04-30 (Note: In most Luzon areas only, except Metro Manila and selected areas of Luzon are on high risk COVID-19 zones) to 2020-05-15 (Note: Lockdown was extended to Metro Manila and remaining areas of Luzon) to 2020-05-31	46 to 61 to 77	2020-08-04 (Note: Metro Manila, Bulacan, Cavite and Rizal only.)	2020-08-18	15	2021-01-25	2021-02-15	21	2021-03-29	2021-09-15	170													61 to 92	Island group
Philippines	Soccsksargen	2020-03-23	2020-05-15	53																						53	Region
Poland		2020-03-13	2020-04-11	29	2020-12-28	2021-01-17	20	2021-03-20	2021-04-25	36																85	National
Portugal		2020-03-19	2020-04-02	14	2021-01-15	2021-03-15	59																			73	National
Qatar	Doha Industrial Area	2020-03-11	2020-06-15	96																						96	Industrial park
Romania		2020-03-25	2020-05-12	48																						48	National
Russia	Moscow	2020-03-30	2020-05-12	43	2021-10-28	2021-11-04	7																			50	Metropolitan area
Russia	Rest of the country (Note: Applies for mandatory holidays and further measures in each Russian region)	2020-03-28	2020-04-30	33																						33	National
Rwanda		2020-03-21	2020-04-19	29																						29	National
Samoa		2020-03-26	2020-04-08	13																						13	National
San Marino		2020-03-14	2020-05-05	52																						52	National
Saudi Arabia	Jeddah	2020-03-29	2020-06-21	84																						84	City
Saudi Arabia	Mecca	2020-03-26	2020-06-21	87																						87	City
Saudi Arabia	Medina	2020-03-26	2020-06-21	87																						87	City
Saudi Arabia	Qatif	2020-03-09	2020-06-21	104																						104	Area
Saudi Arabia	Riyadh	2020-03-26	2020-06-21	87																						87	City
Serbia		2020-03-15	2020-04-21 to 2020-05-04	37 to 50																						37 to 50	National
Singapore		2020-04-07	2020-06-01	56	2021-05-16	2021-06-13	28	2021-07-22	2021-08-09	18	2021-09-27	2021-11-21	56													158	National
South Africa		2020-03-26	2020-04-30	35	2020-12-28	2021-01-15	18	2021-06-28	2021-07-25	27																80	National
Spain		2020-03-14	2020-05-09	56																						56	National
Sri Lanka		2020-03-18	2020-06-21	95	2021-08-20	2021-10-01	42																			137	National
Switzerland		2020-03-17	2020-04-27	41	2021-01-18	2021-03-01	42																			83	National
Thailand		2020-03-25	2020-05-31	67																						67	National
Trinidad and Tobago		2020-03-17	2020-03-31	14																						14	National
Tunisia		2020-03-22	2020-04-19	28																						28	National
Turkey		2020-04-23	2020-04-27	4																						4	Only in 30 metropolitan cities and Zonguldak.
Turkey	Nationwide	2021-04-29	2021-05-17	18																						18	National
Ukraine		2020-03-17	2020-04-24	38																						38	National
United Arab Emirates		2020-03-26	2020-04-17	22																						22	National
United Kingdom	England	2020-03-23	2020-07-04	103	2020-11-05	2020-12-02	27	2021-01-05	2021-03-28 (Note: England has followed an incremental easing of restrictions since 8 March 2021. Most lockdown restrictions were lifted between March and June, July 19 is the date set for the expiry of most legal restrictions in England. Although some sources describe this date as the "end" of lockdown, March 28 was the date in which the "stay at home orders" were ended. This fits the most internationally accepted definition of what constitutes a lockdown.)	83																213	National
United Kingdom	Scotland	2020-03-23	2020-06-29	98	2020-12-26	2021-04-02	97																			195	National
United Kingdom	Northern Ireland	2020-03-23	2020-07-03	102	2020-11-27	2020-12-11	14	2020-12-26	2021-04-12	107																223	Country
United Kingdom	Wales	2020-03-23	2020-07-13	112	2020-10-23	2020-11-09	17	2020-12-20	2021-03-13 (Note: Most lockdown restrictions were lifted between March and June. March 13 was the date in which the "stay at home orders" were ended. This fits the most internationally accepted definition of what constitutes a lockdown.)	83																212	Country
United Kingdom	North West	2020-12-31	2021-03-29	88																						88	Region
United Kingdom	North East	2020-12-31	2021-03-29	88																						88	Region
United Kingdom	East Midlands	2020-12-31	2021-03-29	88																						88	Region
United Kingdom	West Midlands	2020-12-31	2021-03-29	88																						88	Region
United Kingdom	Norfolk	2020-12-26	2021-03-29	93																						93	County
United Kingdom	Suffolk	2020-12-26	2021-03-29	93																						93	County
United Kingdom	Cambridgeshire	2020-12-26	2021-03-29	93																						93	County
United Kingdom	Essex	2020-12-26	2021-03-29	93																						93	County
United Kingdom	London area	2020-12-20	2021-03-29	99																						99	City
United Kingdom	Kent & South East	2020-12-20	2021-03-29	99																						99	Region
United Kingdom	Leicester	2020-06-30	2020-07-24	24																						24	County
United Kingdom	Glasgow				2020-11-20	2020-12-11	21																			21	County
United Kingdom	East Renfrewshire				2020-11-20	2020-12-11	21																			21	County
United Kingdom	Renfrewshire				2020-11-20	2020-12-11	21																			21	County
United Kingdom	East Dunbartonshire				2020-11-20	2020-12-11	21																			21	County
United Kingdom	West Dunbartonshire				2020-11-20	2020-12-11	21																			21	County
United Kingdom	North Lanarkshire				2020-11-20	2020-12-11	21																			21	County
United Kingdom	South Lanarkshire				2020-11-20	2020-12-11	21																			21	County
United Kingdom	East Ayrshire				2020-11-20	2020-12-11	21																			21	County
United Kingdom	South Ayrshire				2020-11-20	2020-12-11	21																			21	County
United Kingdom	West Lothian				2020-11-20	2020-12-11	21																			21	County
United Kingdom	Stirling				2020-11-20	2020-12-11	21																			21	County
United States	California	2020-03-19	2021-06-15	453																						453	State
United States	Connecticut	2020-03-23	2020-04-22	30																						30	State
United States	Illinois	2020-03-21	2020-05-30	70																						70	State
United States	Kansas City in Kansas	2020-03-24	2020-04-19	26																						26	City
United States	Massachusetts	2020-03-24	2020-05-04	41																						41	State
United States	Michigan	2020-03-24	2020-04-13	20																						20	State
United States	New York	2020-03-22	2020-06-13	83																						83	State
United States	Oregon	2020-03-24	2020-05-15	53																						53	State
United States	Wisconsin	2020-03-24	2020-05-13	50																						50	State
Venezuela		2020-03-17	2020-05-13	57																						57	National
Vietnam	Nationwide	2020-04-01	2020-04-22	21																						21	National
Vietnam	Da Nang			21	2020-07-28	2020-09-05	39																			60	City
Vietnam	Hai Duong			21	2021-02-16	2021-03-02	14																			35	Province, Chi Linh city lockdown began from 28 January.
Vietnam	Bac Ninh			21	2021-05-18		23																			23	4 districts and 1 city
Vietnam	Bac Giang			21	2021-05-18		23																			23	6 districts
Zimbabwe		2020-03-30	2020-05-02	33																						33	National
Notes

The pandemic has caused worldwide curfews and similar restrictions (stay-at-home orders, shelter-in-place orders, shutdowns/lockdowns) established to prevent further spread of COVID-19. The pandemic has resulted in the largest amount of shutdowns/lockdowns worldwide at the same time in history. By 26 March, 1.7 billion people worldwide were under some form of lockdown, which increased to 3.9 billion people by the first week of April — more than half of the world's population.

As of 12 April, nearly 300 million people, or about 90 per cent of the population, are under some form of lockdown in the United States, more than 50 million people are in lockdown in the Philippines, about 59 million people are in lockdown in South Africa, and 1.3 billion people are in lockdown in India.

== Africa ==
=== Ghana ===
The first two cases of COVID-19 was confirmed on 12 March 2020, when two infected people came to Ghana; one from Norway and the other from Turkey. On 11 March, President Nana Akufo-Addo directed the Minister of Finance, Ken Ofori-Atta, to make the cedi equivalent of $US100 million available to enhance Ghana's COVID-19 preparedness and response plan. The Ghana COVID-19 Private Sector Fund was also initiated to aid in the fight against the pandemic.

==== Bans and lockdowns ====
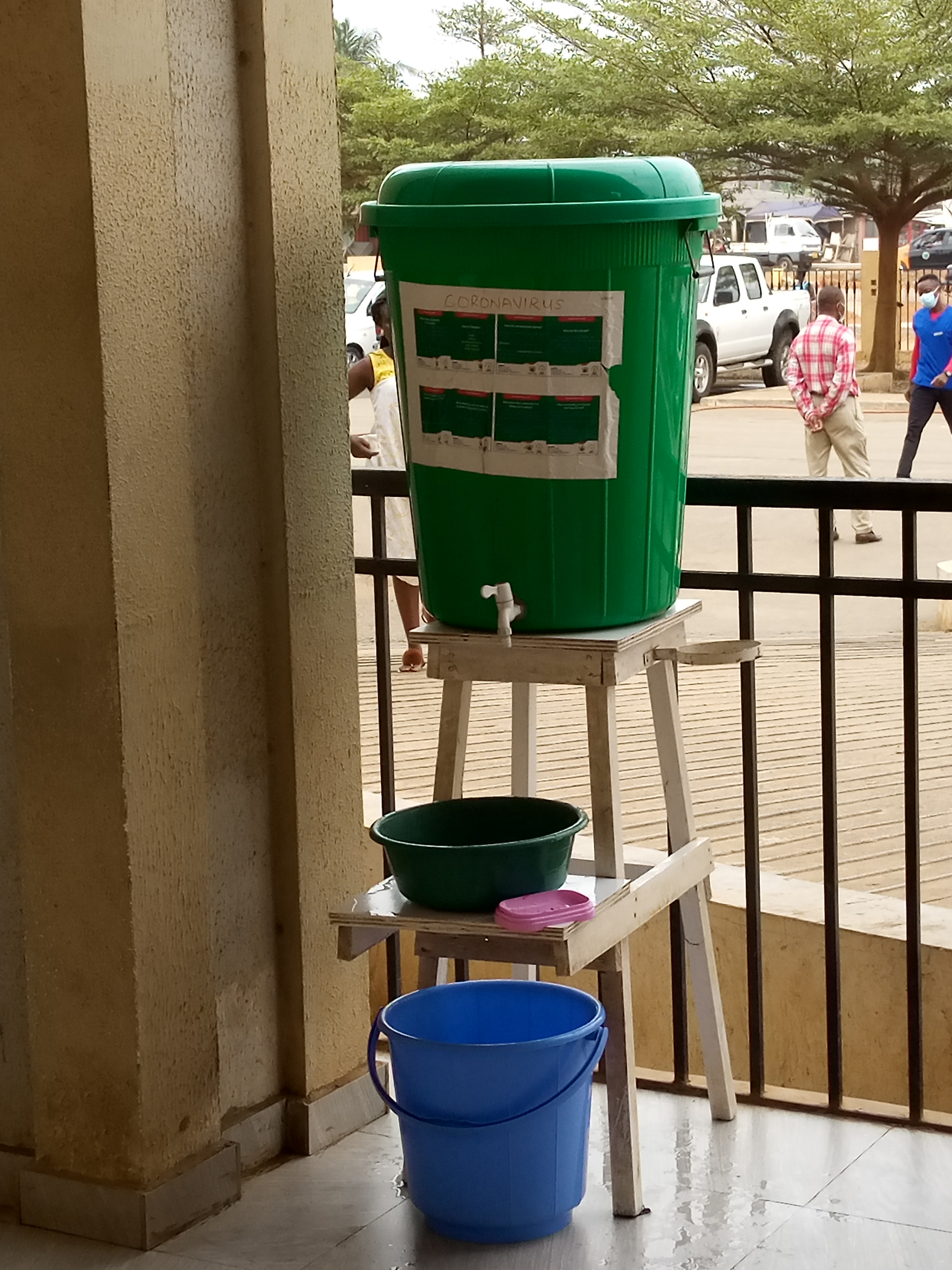
Veronica Bucket, a handwashing mechanism originating in Ghana. It is mounted in many open spaces and at entrances for mandatory hand-washing.

On 15 March, at 10 pm, President Nana Akufo-Addo banned all public gatherings including conferences, workshops, funerals, festivals, political rallies, church activities and other related events to reduce the spread of COVID-19 at a press briefing on the state of COVID-19. Basic schools, senior high schools and universities, both public and private, have also been closed. Only BECE and WASSCE candidates were permitted to remain in school under social distancing protocols. The use of Veronica buckets have become very popular in Ghana following the outbreak of the novel coronavirus as citizens engage in frequent hand washing to stem its spread. On 30 March, the partial lock down of Accra and Kumasi took effect. In April 2020, At a press briefing, the Director General of the Ghana Health Service, announced the commencement of local production of nose masks as part of efforts to arrest the spread of the pandemic. According to the new Executive Instrument, E.I. 164, signed by the President on 15 June 2020, people who refuse to wear face masks in public could face jail terms of between four to ten years or a fine of between GHS12,000 (approx US$2,065) and GHS60,000 (approx US$10,320) or both would be made. This came after the mandatory wearing of face masks

==== Government responses ====
From 3 April, over 464 markets were disinfected across the country. The second phase of nationwide fumigation begun in July. On 23 September, the MoE with GES collaborated with Zoomlion to disinfect SHS across Ghana to pave way for the reopening of schools. The Finance Minister claimed in his report that the Government spent about 54.3 million Ghana cedis to provide cooked and uncooked food to the vulnerable during the 3-week lockdown. He also claimed Government would provide free electricity and water for the rest of 2020.

The Parliament of Ghana granted a tax waiver of GHS174 million cedis (equivalent to US$30 million) on income taxes of frontline workers. This spanned for three months from July to September 2020. On 15 October, the MoH received a COVID-19 AI software for detecting the virus on Chest X-rays. Government also relaunched the GH COVID-19 tracker app after it was launched on 13 April. Various treatment centers were built across the country such as the Ghana Infectious Disease Centre, to help in the National COVID-19 Treatment. Ghana became the first country to use drone aircraft in the fight against the pandemic through the transport of COVID-19 test samples.

=== Namibia ===
On 17 March President Hage Geingob declared a state of emergency as a legal basis to restrict fundamental rights. The prohibition of large gatherings was clarified to apply to 50 or more people. Measures such as the closure of all borders, suspension of gatherings were implemented. All public and private schools were also closed for a month. By 14 April, a National lockdown was enforced to all regions in the country.

==== Access to information and surveillance ====
A COVID-19 communication hotline (0800100100) was established on 15 March 2020 which is run by the Ministry of Health and Social Services and the Centre for Disease Control of Namibia (CDC). The hotline serves to answer general enquiries of the public, assisting persons seeking guidance from the Ministry and reporting possible symptoms or cases of COVID-19.

The Government also announced on 18 March that it will strengthen their communication to the public via various platforms, such as the COVID-19 communication centre operated by NBC, in an attempt to "mitigate and refute misinformation, fear and panic especially from social media". The centre was fully functional by middle April 2020.

With the establishment of a multi-disciplinary Emergency Response team, the Ministry intensified their surveillance in monitoring the situation of COVID-19 in the country, especially at the borders of Namibia. The response team operates 24/7.

==== Testing ====
Before the confirmation of COVID-19 in Namibia, tests could not be done locally. Test samples were instead sent to South Africa, which accounted for longer than usual waiting times. The Namibian Institute of Pathology (NIP) started testing locally in Windhoek at the end of March 2020. In late April, private laboratory PathCare started testing samples. Namibia was hit by a lack of reagents at the end of April, which slowed down testing however, private testing at PathCare was expensive compared to that of the state (NIP) which offers free COVID-19 tests.

==== Economic stimulus package ====
An Emergency Income Grant was set up by government to distribute N$ 750 to every person whose income was affected by the pandemic or faced difficult conditions due to the lockdown. Over 800,000 people applied for this grant; 346,000 of them were paid by the end of April.

=== South Africa ===
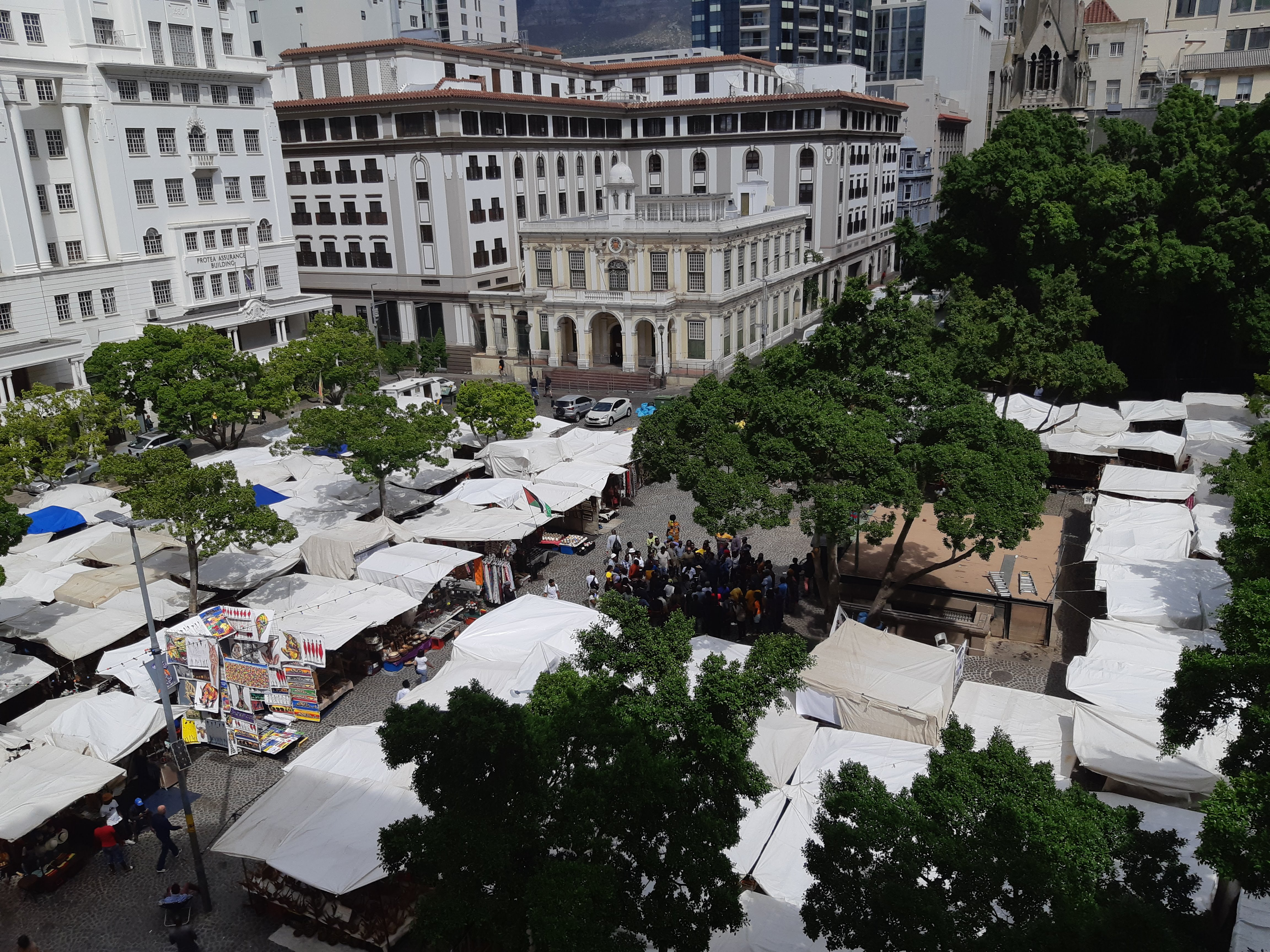
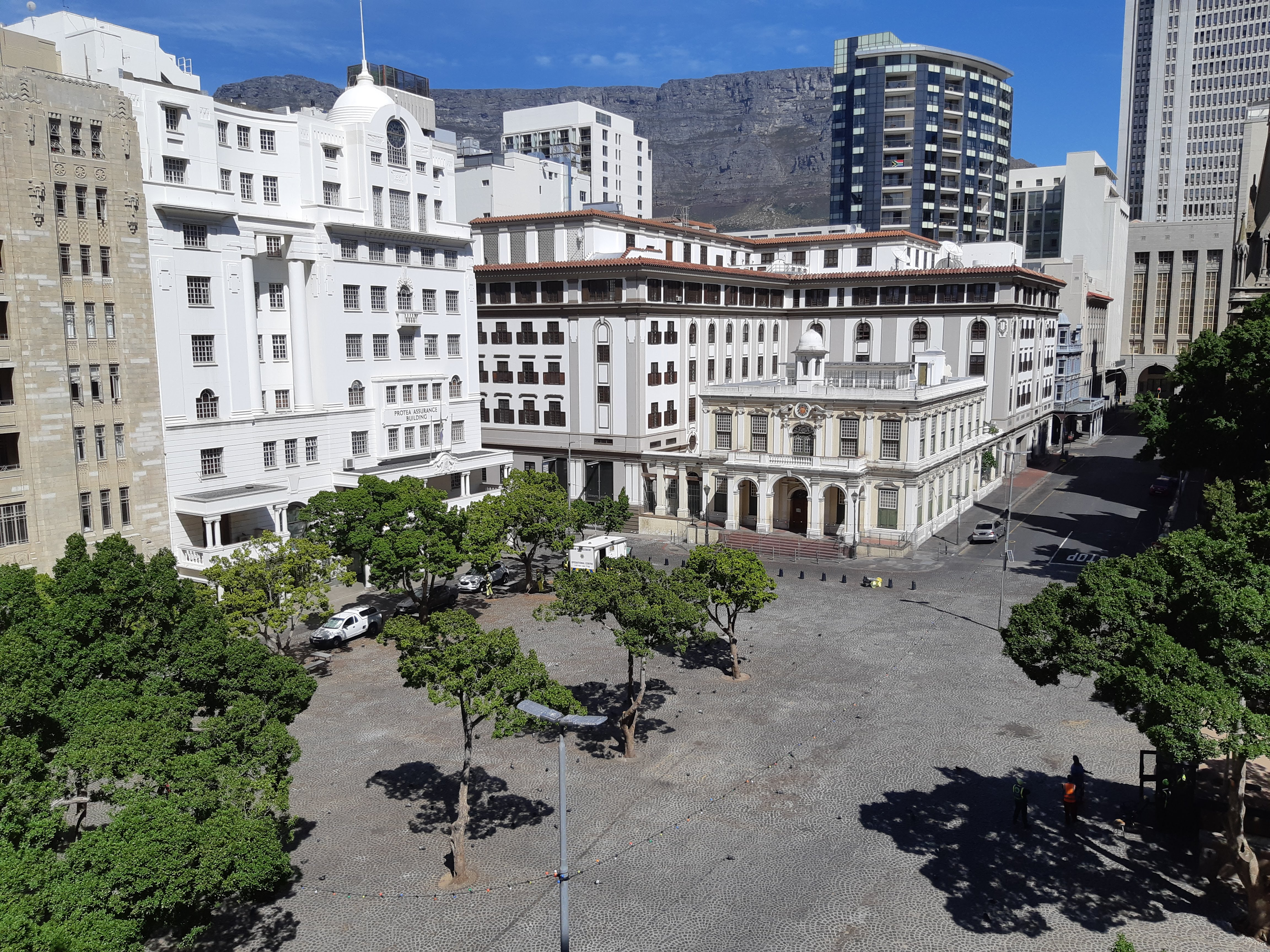
Greenmarket Square in Cape Town, South Africa seven days before (left) and on the first day (right) of the COVID-19 national lockdown. After the lockdown the market stall traders that normally setup on the square everyday are not present and only people exempt from the lockdown (security personnel and municipal employees) can be seen.

President Cyril Ramaphosa declared that South Africa would undergo a national lockdown, for a period of 21 days, from 26 March to 16 April 2020. This drastic measure was intended to help keep the viral infection rate as low as possible and save lives. On Thursday 9 April, President Ramaphosa announced an extension of two weeks to the lockdown, until the end of April. Exempt from the lockdown are people deemed necessary for the effective response to the pandemic such as health workers, pharmacy and laboratory personnel, emergency personnel, security services, supermarkets, transportation and logistical services, petrol stations, banks, essential financial as well as payment services and those working in industries that can affect the economy when shut down. This include mines and steel mills.

==== Testing ====
The National Institute for Communicable Diseases (NICD) started testing people in South Africa for SARS-CoV-2 on 28 January 2020, and by 7 February had conducted 42 of such tests. State hospitals were offering free COVID-19 testing by mid-March. On 30 March 2020, the government announced its intentions of initiating an enhanced screening and testing programme. By the start of April, 67 mobile testing units had been established and 47000 people had been tested, some in drive-through facilities.

==== Clinical trials, vaccines, and treatment ====
On 17 March 2020, the South African Health Products Regulatory Authority announced that it would expedite review of treatments, vaccines and clinical trials. A team from 8 universities and 14 hospitals led by Helen Rees and Jeremy Nel from the University of the Witwatersrand participated in the World Health Organization Solidarity Clinical Trials that investigated medications. A COVID-19 vaccine trial was launched in Gauteng province, towards the end of June 2020 in collaboration with the Jenner Institute, University of Oxford and AstraZeneca. A second vaccine trial was launched during mid August 2020 in collaboration with a US Maryland based biotechnology company, Novavax, with funding from the Bill & Melinda Gates Foundation. A third vaccine trial was launched in September 2020 by Johnson & Johnson/Janssen.

=== Other countries and territories ===
- Algeria
- Angola
- Benin
- Botswana
- Burkina Faso
- Burundi
- Cameroon
- Canary Islands
- Cape Verde
- Central African Republic
- Chad
- Congo, Democratic Republic of the
- Congo, Republic of the
- Djibouti
- Egypt
- Equatorial Guinea
- Eritrea
- Eswatini
- Ethiopia
- Gabon
- Gambia
- Guinea
- Guinea-Bissau
- Ivory Coast
- Kenya
- Liberia
- Libya
- Madagascar
- Malawi
- Mali
- Mauritania
- Mauritius
- Mayotte
- Morocco
- Mozambique
- Niger
- Nigeria
- Réunion
- Rwanda
- São Tomé and Príncipe
- Senegal
- Seychelles
- Sierra Leone
- Somalia
- South Sudan
- Sudan
- Tanzania
- Togo
- Tunisia
- Uganda
- Western Sahara
- Zambia
- Zimbabwe

== Asia ==
=== China ===
During the COVID-19 pandemic in mainland China, the Chinese Communist Party (CCP) and government of China under CCP general secretary Xi Jinping's administration pursued a zero-COVID strategy to prevent the domestic spread of COVID-19 until late 2022. Aspects of the response have been controversial, with the zero-COVID approach being praised and the government's lack of transparency, censorship, and spread of misinformation being criticized. The government abandoned its zero-COVID policy on 7 December 2022.

After discovery of a cluster of patients with pneumonia of unknown etiology in Wuhan, Hubei Province, a public notice on the outbreak was distributed on 31 December 2019. Three days earlier on 28 December 2019, Chinese researchers in Beijing uploaded a fully mapped sequence of COVID-19's structure to the NIH GenBank, but the report was never publicly accessible due to it missing technical, non-scientific information required for submission despite NIH attempts to communicate with the report author. On 8 January 2020, a new coronavirus (SARS-CoV-2) was announced by Chinese scientists as the cause of the new disease; and on 10 January a nearly identical virus to the 28 December upload was sequenced and its genome made available online. On 17 January 2024, The Wall Street Journal released a report about the former 28 December upload that officially contradicted the Chinese government's claim that knowledge of the cause of the outbreak in the early weeks of January 2020 was unknown, and that information was shared as soon as it was available.

On 23 January 2020, the Chinese government banned travel to and from Wuhan, enforced strict quarantines in affected regions and initiated a national response. The epidemic in Hubei province peaked on 4 February 2020. Large temporary hospitals were built in Wuhan to isolate patients with mild-to-moderate symptoms, with the first opening on 5 February 2020. The epidemic was heavily concentrated within Hubei province and Wuhan. Through 22 March 2020, over 80% of the recorded cases in China were in Hubei province, with over 60% of cases nationwide occurring in Wuhan alone.

By the summer of 2020, China had largely brought the outbreak under control, ending widespread community transmission. After the initial outbreak, lockdowns and other restrictive measures were eased throughout China. The lockdown in Wuhan was lifted on 8 April 2020. It is estimated that the epidemic control measures held the death toll due to COVID-19 in Wuhan to under 5,000 from January to March 2020.

China was one of a small number of countries that pursued an elimination strategy, sustaining zero or low case numbers over the long term. Until late 2022, most cases in China were imported from abroad, and several new outbreaks were quickly controlled through intense short-term public health measures, including large-scale testing, contact tracking technology, and mandatory isolation of infected individuals. In the 18 months following containment of the initial outbreak in Wuhan, two COVID-19 deaths were recorded. In December 2022, the Chinese government ended its zero-COVID policy and mass testing following protests across the country.

In 2020 and 2021, China was the largest exporter of COVID-19 critical medical products. China was the world's largest exporter of face masks, increasing exports by around 600% in the first half of 2020. A number of COVID-19 vaccines have been developed in China, which have been used in its vaccination programme and international vaccine diplomacy. Through November 2021, China was the world's largest exporter of COVID-19 vaccines, with a cumulative share of around 40% of worldwide exports (totalling around 1.5 billion doses), according to the World Trade Organization.

China's response to the initial Wuhan COVID-19 outbreak has been both praised and criticised. In October 2020, The Lancet Infectious Diseases reported: "While the world is struggling to control COVID-19, China has managed to control the pandemic rapidly and effectively." The Chinese government has been criticized for censorship, which observers have attributed to a culture of institutional censorship affecting the country's press and Internet. The government censored whistleblowers, journalists, and social media posts about the outbreak. During the beginning of the pandemic, the Chinese government made efforts to clamp down on discussion and hide reporting about it, as such information was seen as unfavorable for local officials. Efforts to fund and control research into the virus's origins have continued up to the present.

Due to its zero-COVID policy, China's economy continued to squeeze. However, on 11 November 2022, the government eased the restrictions, while claiming to continue the war against the pandemic. The government reduced the quarantine restrictions from 10 days to eight, where travelers were required to spend five days instead of seven in a hotel quarantine and three at home. Besides, the airlines were also exempted from a penalty for bringing in COVID positive travelers.

=== India ===
The Indian government airlifted 324 of its citizens from China on 31 January and 1 February via Air India special chartered flights. After Pakistan's refusal to evacuate its students from Wuhan, the Indian government offered to support them with evacuation along with citizens of other neighbouring countries. On 17 February, India announced a special C-17 Globemaster flight carrying medical supplies to support China in Wuhan and evacuating citizens of India and neighbouring countries. India eventually evacuated 647 people including citizens of Maldives and Bangladesh.

On 15 March, after a video conference of SAARC leaders, PM Narendra Modi allocated ₹74 crore (US$10 million) of funds classified as COVID-19 Emergency Fund for the SAARC countries.

As a precautionary measure, India closed all of its international land borders on 16 March. On 22 March, India locked down places where cases had been confirmed—82 districts in 22 states and Union Territories—until 31 March, although essential services and commodities were to continue. 80 cities including major cities such as Bengaluru, Chennai, Delhi, Mumbai, Kolkata, Nagpur, Varanasi and Raipur were also put under lockdown.

On 24 March, the government announced a nationwide lockdown to be in effect for 21 days from 25 March until 14 April. This lockdown included Indian Railways, the biggest employer in India; it was the first shutdown of the trains in 167 years.

=== Indonesia ===
Many Indonesians criticised the government for a slow response and downplaying the pandemic. WHO, Australian government, and United States embassy in Indonesia have expressed their doubts about the Indonesian government's response to the pandemic.

The governor of West Sumatra province, Irwan Prayitno faced backlash for accepting 174 tourists from China to the province. 174 Chinese tourists from Kunming arrived at Minangkabau International Airport at Padang Pariaman Regency as Citilink adds Padang – Kunming route. Prayitno received further backlash after welcoming the group of tourists himself at the airport and giving them a "grand welcome" with a cultural parade. The move angered local residents who demanded the governor return the group to China.

Health experts are concerned that the country is failing to identify the transmission of the virus. Marc Lipsitch, professor of epidemiology at the Harvard T. H. Chan School of Public Health, "analysed air traffic out of the Chinese city at the centre of the outbreak in China and suggested in a report ... that Indonesia might have missed cases" of coronavirus. Western diplomats as well as local and international news outlets postulated that the lack of cases within Indonesia result from inadequate testing and under reporting, as opposed to sheer luck and divine intervention.

The government faced a backlash after instead pledging to set aside IDR 72 billion ($5m) to pay for social media influencers to attract tourists to Indonesia.

Indonesian president Joko Widodo has been criticised by the Indonesian Chamber of Commerce and Industry, human rights groups, and by political parties including Golkar and Partai Keadilan Sejahtera for a lack of transparency regarding the information on COVID-19. Widodo has insisted not to share with the travel history details of patients tested positive with COVID-19 in an attempt to reduce panic and uneasiness in the general public.

=== Iran ===
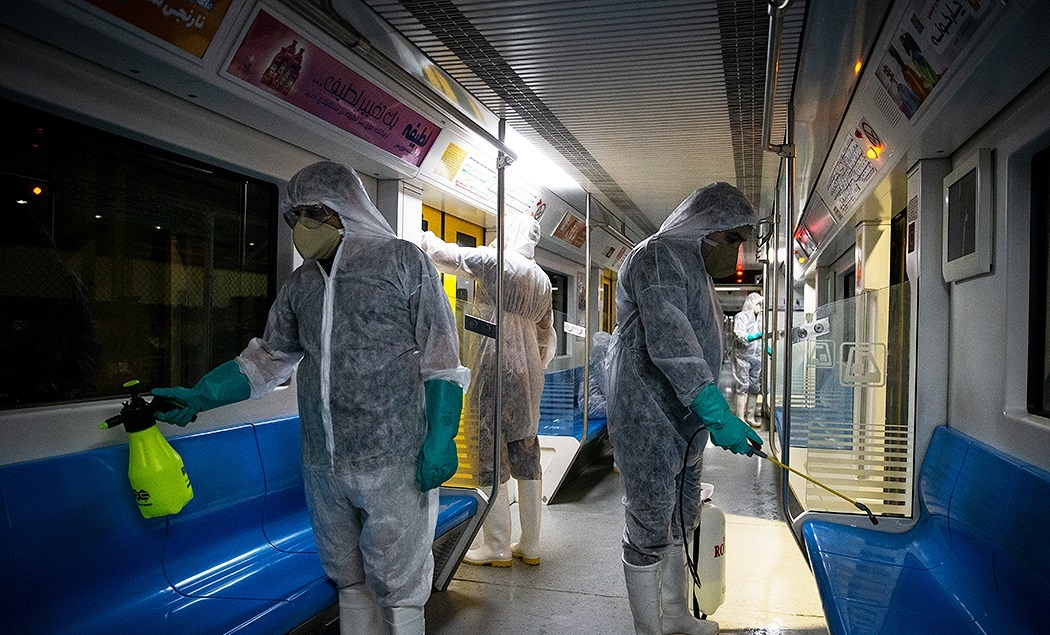
Disinfection of Tehran subway wagons against COVID-19

Iran reported its first confirmed cases of SARS-CoV-2 infections on 19 February 2020 in Qom, where according to the Ministry of Health and Medical Education, both had died later that day.

Early measures announced by the government included the cancellation of concerts and other cultural events, sporting events, and Friday prayers, closure of universities, higher education institutions and schools, and allocated 5 trillion rials to combat the virus. President Hassan Rouhani said on 26 February 2020 that there were no plans to quarantine areas affected by the outbreak, and only individuals would be quarantined. However, Shia shrines in Qom remained open to pilgrims.

Iran became a center of the spread of the virus after China. Amidst claims of a cover-up of the extent of the outbreak in the country, over ten countries have traced their cases back to Iran, indicating that the extent of the outbreak may be more severe than that admitted by the Iranian government. The Iranian Parliament was shut down, with 23 of the 290 members of parliament reported to have had tested positive for the virus on 3 March. A number of senior government officials as well as two members of parliament have died from the disease.

==== Criticism against Iranian government's responses ====
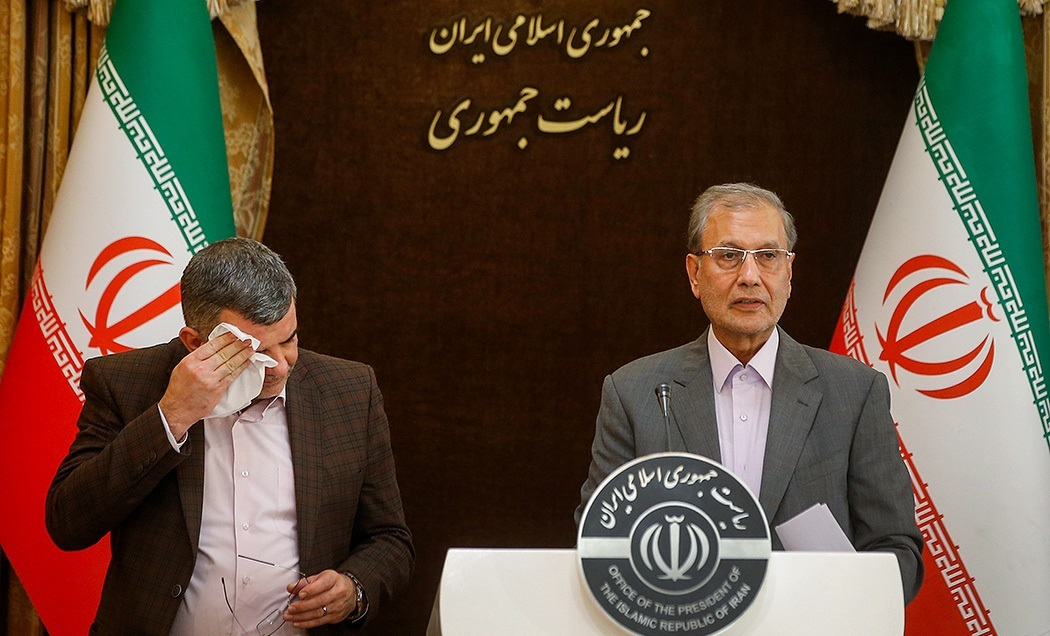
Deputy Health Minister Iraj Harirchi (left) at a press conference after which he tested positive for the virus.

Iranians criticized government authorities for proceeding with elections while the disease was spreading and closing secular spaces while keeping shrines open, especially in the Shia holy city of Qom. Asif Shuja of the National University of Singapore's Middle East Institute suggested that "the fact that Iran reported deaths on the same day as its first infections right before its parliamentary elections 'can compel anyone' that there has been a cover-up". Scrutiny has also been targeted at the government's unwillingness to implement area-wide quarantine measures like those implemented by China and Italy, with Iranian officials calling quarantines "old-fashioned." There have been concerns that the Iranian government's official counts were an underestimate. The WHO's director-general, Tedros Adhanom Ghebreyesus, said that "the WHO has its "own mechanism" for checking facts and has not seen problems with Iran's reported figures".

=== Japan ===
On 27 February 2020, Prime Minister Shinzo Abe requested that all Japanese elementary, junior high, and high schools close until early April to help contain the virus.

The outbreak led to concern for the 2020 Summer Olympics which was scheduled to take place in Tokyo starting at the end of July. The Japanese government took extra precautions to help minimise the outbreak's impact. The government and the International Olympic Committee negotiated a postponement of the Summer Olympics to 2021.

==== Criticism against Japanese government's responses ====
Foreign Policy and The Guardian reported that relations between Japan and South Korea worsened, as South Korea criticized Japan's "ambiguous and passive quarantine efforts". On 5 March, Japan announced that it would strengthen quarantine for new entrants from China and South Korea and add some areas of Iran to the target area. The Chinese authorities showed their understanding of the decision, but the Japanese media and South Korean government criticized it. The Japanese media said that the decision was too late because they were too careful with China, and the Korean government turned it into a political issue.

Japan's Ministry of Health, Labor and Welfare has been criticized for a perceived delayed response. Critics have observed that while Japan announced the first case of infection on 28 January, it took until 17 February for the Health Ministry to inform the public on how to reach public screening centers and 25 February, for the government to issue a "basic policy" on outbreak response.

The strict constraints on testing for the virus by Japanese health authorities have drawn accusations from critics such as Masahiro Kami, a hematologist and director of the Medical Governance Research Institute but not an infectious disease expert, towards Abe of wanting to "downplay the number of infections or patients because of the upcoming Olympics."

But the fact-checking in some media later reported to proved that it was fake news that 'the number of infected people was being reduced for the Olympics by the government.' Reports that only a small select number of public health facilities were authorized to test for the virus, after which the results could only be processed by five government-approved companies, has created a bottleneck where clinics have been forced to turn away even patients who had high fevers. This has led some experts to question Japan's official case numbers, with Tobias Harris, of Teneo Intelligence in Washington, D.C. stating "You wonder, if they were testing nearly as much as South Korea is testing, what would the actual number be? How many cases are lurking and just aren't being caught?" As mentioned above, there were many articles criticizing the small number of PCR tests in Japan compared to South Korea, mainly in the Japanese and Korean media. However, the number of PCR tests in Japan at that time was actually not small at all. According to data released by the Ministry of Health, Labour and Welfare the Japanese authorities conducted PCR tests of 10,205 as of 13 and 15 March 655 as of 17 March, except for those returning from China by charter flight and passengers on the cruise ship. The number of tests in Japan appears to be small compared to 320,000 in China, 250,000 in South Korea, 86,000 in Italy, and 77,000 in Russia. However, only 30,000 in the UK, 16,000 in Taiwan, and the United States had a higher number of tests than Japan except for that four countries. In terms of population ratio, the ranking was lower, but the number of tests in Japan was still at the average level.

The quarantine measures on the cruise ship Diamond Princess has also been criticised, even though there is no obligation under the international law to accept port calls for Japan and except for Japanese nationals on board, there is no obligation in Japan to treat all passengers, and the treatment is a good faith act, and the quarantine was the exercise of provisions in accordance with international and domestic laws. But Kentaro Iwata, an infectious disease professor at Kobe University Hospital, said that "the condition aboard was completely chaotic" and "violating all infection control principles". Dr. Yoshihiro Takayama, a member of the Ministry of Health, Labor and Welfare who helped Iwata board the ship, said that Iwata had fight with DMAT members about his separate action and was forced to disembark in two hours, so he just looked around the lounge. A preliminary report by Japan's National Institute of Infectious Diseases (NIID) estimated that most of the transmission on the ship had occurred before the quarantine, based on the first 184 cases. On 22 February, the Health Ministry admitted that 23 passengers were disembarked without being properly tested for the virus. On 23 February, a Japanese woman who tested negative before disembarking from the cruise ship later tested positive after returning to her home in Tochigi Prefecture. She was not among the 23 passengers. Many passengers who were negative in the PCR test were tested positive after disembarking.

=== Philippines ===
The first COVID-19 death outside China occurred in the Philippines on 1 February.

On 9 March 2020, President Rodrigo Duterte suspended classes in all levels in Metro Manila from 10 to 15 March. The class suspension in Metro Manila was extended to 12 April, following the decision of concerned authorities to raise the COVID-19 alert level in the country to Code Red Sublevel 2. Work in the executive branch of the government was also suspended for the same period as part of the Stringent Social Distancing Measures in the National Capital Region (NCR), with the directive for the concerned government agencies to form skeletal forces to ensure the delivery of basic services. Congress and the Judiciary were encouraged to do the same. Agencies providing law enforcement services, health services, and emergency services were enjoined to continue to operate at full capacity.

Other salient directives, contained in a resolution adopted by the Inter-Agency Task Force for the Management of Emerging Infectious Diseases (IATF-EID) and announced by the Philippine President on 12 March, at the Heroes Hall in Malacañang Palace, included, the prohibition of mass gatherings that could strain the resources of the host community, imposition of community quarantine over Metro Manila, and encouragement of flexible work arrangements for the private sector among others.

A memorandum containing the guidelines for stringent social distancing measures and the management of COVID-19 in the National Capital Region was issued by Executive Secretary Salvador Medialdea by order of the president on 13 March. Among the directives embodied in the memorandum were suspension of classes and all school activities until 14 April, prohibition of mass gatherings, imposition of strict social distancing during essential meetings and religious activities, and provisions for alternative and/or flexible work arrangements.

On 16 March, the president signed Proclamation No. 929 declaring a state of calamity throughout the country for a period of six months, bringing into effect the price control of basic needs and commodities, granting of interest-free loans, distribution of calamity funds and hazard allowance for public health workers and government personnel in the fields of science and technology.

President Duterte also placed the island of Luzon (including its associated islands) under enhanced community quarantine on 16 March that further restricted the movement of people through the suspension of mass public transport and the closure of non-essential establishments. Business Process Outsourcing and export-oriented businesses were allowed to continue operation subject to certain conditions. Relevant government agencies were ordered to provide social amelioration measures. Following the sharp increase of confirmed cases, President Duterte called Congress to a special session to "authorize the President to exercise powers necessary to carry out urgent measures to meet the current national emergency related to the Coronavirus Disease (COVID-19)."

=== South Korea ===
The first confirmed case of COVID-19 was identified with a 35-year-old Chinese woman on 20 January. The first South Korean national to be infected occurred three days later was a 55-year-old man who worked in Wuhan and returned for a checkup with flu symptoms. The two infection reports were publicly released on 24 January. The sixth patient was the first case in South Korea who had never visited Wuhan. The 56-year-old man caught the virus when visiting a restaurant with the third patient.

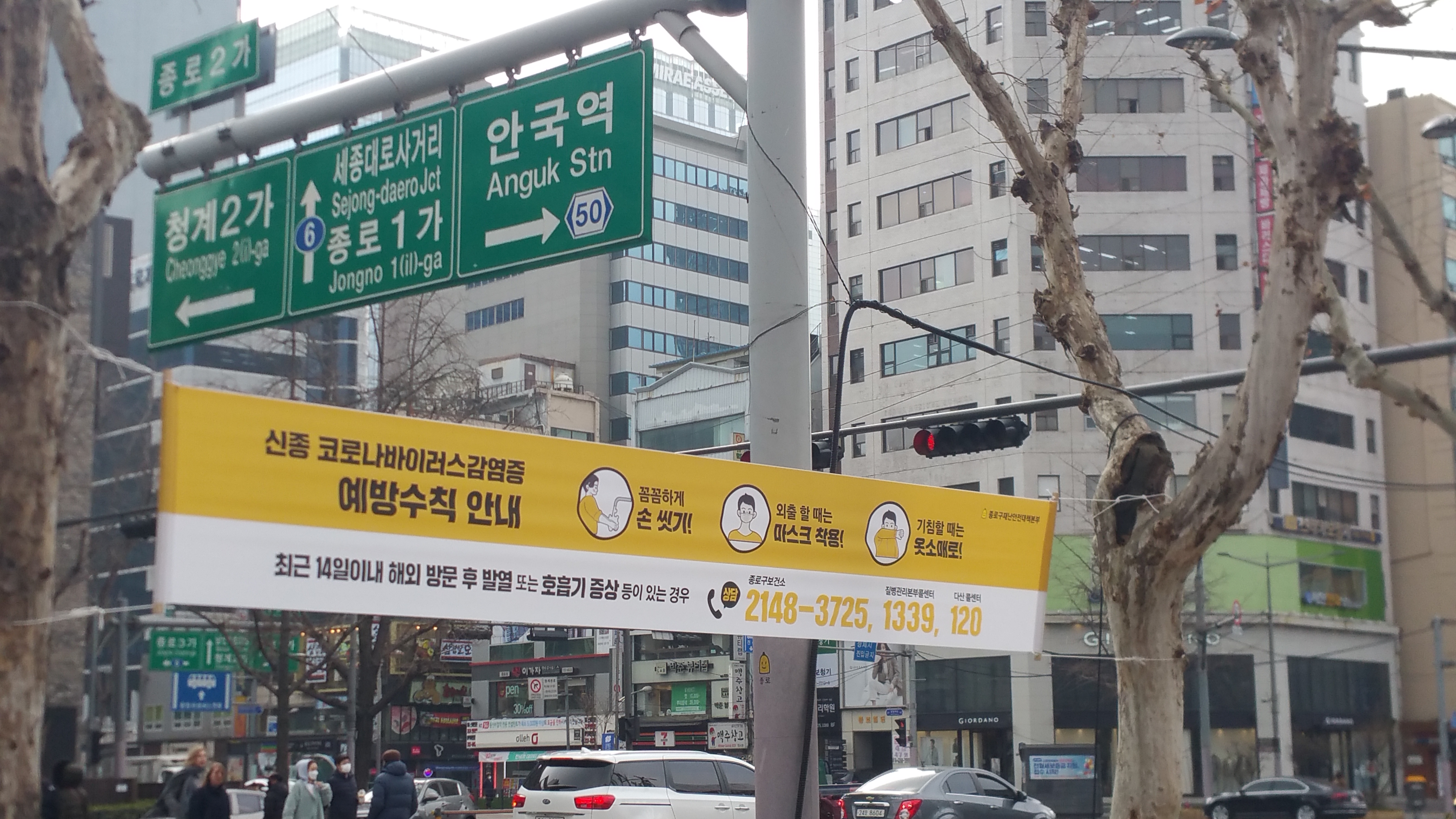
COVID-19 infection prevention tips banner in Seoul, South Korea

A woman, who had returned from Thailand after a five-day vacation, was tested positive and confirmed as the sixteenth case on 4 February. Three more cases were confirmed on 5 February, bringing the total case count to 19. The seventeenth and nineteenth patients had attended a conference in Singapore and been in contact with an infected person there. The very same day the Centers for Disease Control and Prevention Korea (KCDC) announced that the second patient had been released from hospital after being tested negative in consecutive tests, becoming the country's first COVID-19 patient to fully recover.

On 19 February, the number of confirmed cases increased by 20. On 20 February 70 new cases were confirmed, giving a total of 104 confirmed cases, according to the KCDC. According to Reuters, KCDC attributed the sudden jump to 70 cases linked to "Patient No. 31", who had participated in a gathering in Daegu at the Shincheonji Church of Jesus the Temple of the Tabernacle of the Testimony.

On 20 February, the streets of Daegu were empty in reaction to the Shincheonji outbreak. A resident described the reaction, stating "It's like someone dropped a bomb in the middle of the city. It looks like a zombie apocalypse." The first death was reported in a mental ward of Cheongdo Daenam Hospital in Cheongdo County. According to the mayor of Daegu, the number of suspected cases as of 21 February was 544 among 4,400 examined followers of the church. The hospital was suspected as the source of the present outbreak after it was visited by a woman who became the second fatal case of Korea on that day. The infection spread outside via a funeral ceremony attended by members of the church.

All South Korean military bases were on lockdown after tests confirmed that three soldiers were indeed positive for the virus. Airlines cut connections and cultural schedules were being cancelled due to fears of further spread. United States Forces Korea raised the alert level from low to moderate and cut off non-essential travel to and from USFK Daegu. USFK Daegu's school facilities were closed and non-essential personnel were ordered to stay at home while any visitors going there were not allowed to enter. USFK announced that the widow of a retired soldier who was in Daegu was diagnosed to be positive for the virus on 24 February. Camp Humphreys enacted virus detection protocols, including temperature checks and raised the alert level to high. On 26 February, an American soldier based at Camp Carroll was diagnosed to be positive and was quarantined away from bases via off-base housing unit with contact tracing done that showed his movements to Camp Walker.

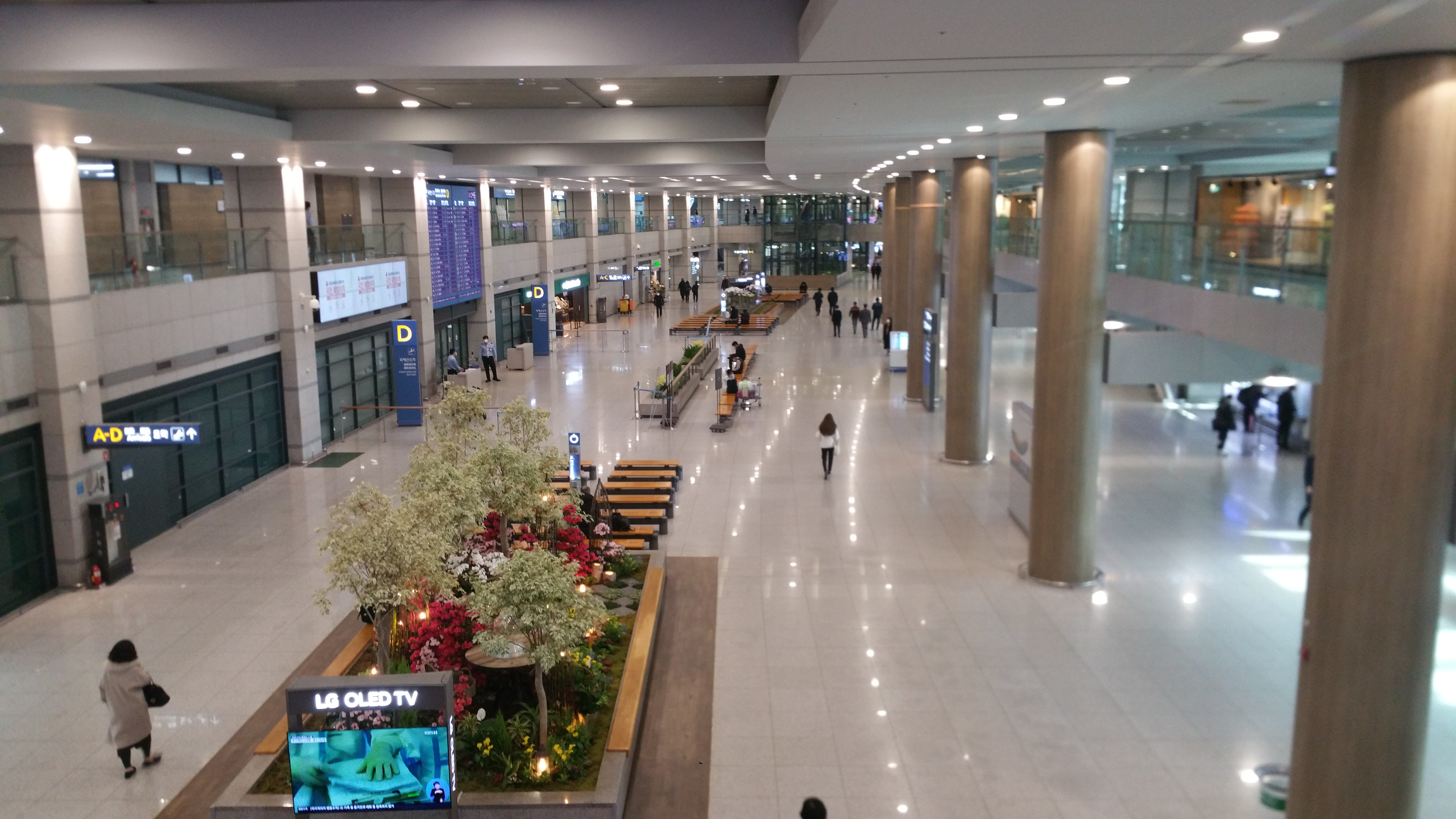
The near-empty arrival hall of Seoul–Incheon International Airport in South Korea on 6 March

As of 22 February, among 9,336 followers of the church, 1,261 reported symptoms. At the time, 169 confirmed cases involved the church and another 111 came from the Cheongdo Daenam Hospital. 23 February saw another 123 cases with 75 being from Shincheonji and 24 February saw 161 additional cases with 129 being from the religious group. Over 27,000 people have been tested for the virus with 19,127 negative results.

On 24 February 15 countries imposed travel restrictions to and from South Korea. It was also reported that a senior health official overseeing the COVID-19 efforts in Daegu tested positive and was also a member of Shincheonji. Within a few days, a petition to the nation's president urging for the disbandment of the church had over 750,000 signatures. Their headquarters in Gwacheon was raided by law enforcement; government officials said all 245,000 members of the religious group would be found and tested. On 28 February, over 2,000 confirmed cases were reported, rising to 3,150 on 29 February.

On 8 March, KCDC in South Korea announced that 79.4% of confirmed COVID-19 cases were related to group infection. KCDC also announced that outbreak associated with Shincheonji Church totaled 4,482 infections, accounting for 62.8% of the total confirmed cases. 13 March was the first time since the outbreak on 20 January in which the number of recoveries, 177, was larger than the number of those who newly tested positive, 110.

As infection rates have risen outside Korea leading to increases of sick arriving in the country (476 of 9,661 cases were imported as of 30 March), the KCDC implemented stronger infectious disease control measures for travelers coming from overseas as of 1 April. By 9 April 2020, South Korea had about 10,423 cases and 204 deaths, with over 494,711 people having been tested, a case fatality rate of 1.95%, which is lower than the WHO's global case fatality rate of 4.34%.

Seeing the infodemic on COVID-19 information starting in China and spreading to Korea and the US, fake news researcher Cha Meeyoung of KAIST and the Institute for Basic Science, along with researchers from Ewha Womans University, started the multilingual Facts Before Rumors campaign to separate common claims seen online.

By 17 April, the KCDC stated that it knew of 163 patients who were said to have recovered, but again tested positive. The exact cause was not known but they stated several possibilities. After several days with new infections numbering in the single digits (18, 20, 22 April), the government announced it was going to start lifting restrictions starting with stores, restaurants, gyms, cram schools, bars, and religious services; which is notable as most of the nation's infections came from places of worship. In coming weeks, arboretums, forests and national parks will begin to open with social distancing still in place until at least early May. After seeing Korea successfully lower cases of infection, President Moon Jae-in has engaged in "coronavirus diplomacy" with leaders of other nations, part of which involved exporting test kits to more than 20 countries. On 26 April, confirmed patient number 31 in Daegu was discharged after 67 days.

==== Criticism against South Korean government's responses ====
The Ministry of Health and Welfare had been criticized for unilaterally implementing telephone consultation and prescription without discussing with the Korea Medical Association, and for not restricting traffic from China despite several warnings from the association and a petition proposed by the society.

On 22 February, the South Korean government apologized for calling the virus "Daegu Corona 19" in an official report. The term had been widespread on social media and raised concerns about discrimination.

More than 1.5 million South Koreans signed a petition to impeach President Moon Jae-in over what they claimed was the government's mishandling of the outbreak. On 6 March, the South Korean government only had entry restricted to Japanese citizens out of 102 countries that blocked Korea. The action had been widespread on social media and raised concerns about anti-Japanese discrimination.

=== Turkey ===
On 10 January 2020, ignoring China's insistence on the lack of evidence for human-to-human transmission, Ministry of Health experts stated that they suspected that SARS-CoV-2 was transmitted among people, and accordingly set up the Coronavirus Scientific Advisory Board. 26 experts in infectious diseases and clinical microbiology originally comprised the Coronavirus Advisory Board, which was subsequently enlarged to include five additional experts in intensive care medicine, internal medicine, and virology. The board put forward voluntary recommendations while the government issued legal restrictions for businesses and public gatherings.

In the early hours of 11 March 2020 (UTC+03:00), the Minister of Health Fahrettin Koca announced that a Turkish man who had contracted the virus while travelling in Europe was the country's first confirmed COVID-19 case. The patient had been placed in isolation at an undisclosed hospital, and family members of the patient were put under observation.

On 12 March 2020, the Ministry of National Education announced that with the exception of schools catering to students with special needs, all schools in Turkey would close starting on 16 March 2020. Given the intense learning needs of students with disabilities, the Ministry of National Education announced that elementary-, middle- and high-school students with special needs will continue to have in-person attendance in fixed small groups, with adults rotating into the class, so as to facilitate contact tracing. The Ministry of National Education subsequently announced that teachers and staff in schools for students with special needs are able to opt out of in-person teaching if they or their families have a health risk.

On 17 March, Minister Selçuk stated that a subset of teachers are focusing on content generation for the national online platform on TRT EBA TV, which became functional on 23 March 2020, with the rest of the teachers matched to students to provide individual assessment, coaching, and tutoring from 23 March to 31 May 2020.

After the Ministry of National Education announced the closure of all schools (except those catering to students with special needs) on 12 March 2020, the government acknowledged the impact of the closure of schools on the welfare of children. Noting that children with preexisting mental-health issues or who live in non-supportive home environments are likely to suffer from being out of school, the government announced emergency measures, including fund increases for foster children, expansion of the nutrition assistance program, direct payments to families, and a national moratorium on evictions. To alleviate the social isolation of students, the Minister Ziya Selçuk piloted a project on 27 March, where the Ministry of National Education started paying schools to offer small group activities for students on Mondays and Fridays, with deep cleaning sessions in between.

On 21 March, the Ministry of Transport and Infrastructure a total curfew for those who are over the age 65 or chronically ill. On 27 March, the Ministry of the Interior issued a new statement regarding gatherings during weekends, announcing that starting from 28 to 29 March, having picnics, fishing at the shores, doing physical exercise outside (including running and walking on the weekends in city and town centers) would be banned until the virus spread has been contained. It was also stated that, should they deem it necessary, local authorities may extend these new measures to weekdays. Also on 27 March, President Erdoğan announced that all overseas flights were terminated, adding that intercity travel was subject to permission by the state governors, and that places such as picnic areas, forests and historical sites would be closed on the weekend. On 3 April 2020, President Erdoğan announced a 15-day entry ban to 30 metropolitan municipalities as well as Zonguldak. Also, the curfew was extended to people younger than 20 years old. Using masks in public places became mandatory.

==== Criticism against Turkish government's responses ====
The announced ₺100 billion economic measures package, set to be provided by the government, was criticized by institutions and individuals, including economists and politicians. The lack of a detailed action plan was the center of criticism. Additionally, at a time when people were encouraged to stay at home, the government was criticized for allowing airline passenger transport and tax reductions that support tourism. Critics asked for lowering the down payment of housing loans and emphasized on the need to provide employment support to different sectors.

The donation campaign initiated by President Recep Tayyip Erdoğan was supported by representatives of the ruling party, members of the oppositions had a less favorable reaction to it. After the government's decision to take money from the income of several institutions in order to make donations to this campaign, the Confederation of Public Employees' Unions filed a criminal complaint as a result of the salary cuts of the staff of many institutions such as MEB, BOTAŞ, General Directorate of Forestry, Ministry of Justice, Constitutional Court and Social Service Provincial Directorates. Additionally, a similar donation campaign initiated by the metropolitan municipalities with CHP administration was terminated by the Ministry of the Interior and their bank accounts were blocked. Regarding this decision, the Ankara Bar Association issued a statement, saying: "Although the aforementioned circular and blocking process enforced by the Ministry of the Interior are clearly unlawful, the provision of social services belongs neither exclusively to the local governments nor to the central government."

=== Other countries and territories ===
- Afghanistan
- Armenia
- Azerbaijan
- Bahrain
- Bangladesh
- Bhutan
- Brunei
- Cambodia
- Cyprus
- Georgia
- Hong Kong
- Iraq
- Israel
- Jordan
- Kazakhstan
- Kuwait
- Kyrgyzstan
- Laos
- Lebanon
- Macau
- Malaysia
- Maldives
- Mongolia
- Myanmar
- Nepal
- Oman
- Pakistan
- Palestine
- Qatar
- Saudi Arabia
- Singapore
- Sri Lanka
- Syria
- Taiwan
- Thailand
- Timor-Leste
- Turkmenistan
- United Arab Emirates
- Uzbekistan
- Vietnam
- Yemen

== Europe ==
=== France ===
Empty streets in Paris, 2020

The earliest discovered infection came from an old sample collected on 27 December 2019. A superspreader event in the outbreak was the annual assembly of the Christian Open Door Church between 17 and 24 February 2020. It was attended by about 2,500 people, at least half of whom were believed to have contracted the virus.

On 13 March 2020, Prime Minister Édouard Philippe ordered the closure of "non-essential" public places, and on 16 March, President Emmanuel Macron announced mandatory home confinement.

=== Germany ===
At the end of January 2020, the first cases occurred in Bavaria in direct connection with the outbreak in Wuhan, China. After initial stagnation, several other cases were reported in different locations. During carnival in February, Heinsberg in Northrhine Westfalia was most affected, and case numbers steadily increased. By the second week of March, all federal states were affected and the first fatality was reported. As of 28 March 2020 the incidence was highest in the city state of Hamburg, followed by Baden-Württemberg and Bavaria. The Robert Koch Institute recommended an initial strategy of containment, until more cases would occur than could be traced back to a known case. The next phase of the epidemic, namely community transmission, was assumed to have begun first in Heinsberg, where a strategy of protection of vulnerable groups was adopted.

=== Greece ===
On 26 February, the first case in Greece was confirmed, a 38-year-old woman from Thessaloniki who had recently visited Northern Italy. Within the next days, health and state authorities issued precautionary guidelines and recommendations, while measures up to that point were taken locally and included the closure of schools and the suspension of cultural events in the affected areas (particularly Ilia, Achaea and Zakynthos). Various municipalities around the country began disinfecting schools. The Greek National Public Health Organization (NPHO), in collaboration with local authorities and doctors, is tracking and testing everyone who came in close contact with the confirmed carriers.

By 10 March, with 89 confirmed cases and no deaths in the country, the government decided to suspend the operation of all schools, universities, daycare centers and all other educational establishments nationwide and then, on 13 March, to close down all cafes, bars, museums, shopping centres, sports facilities and restaurants in the country. On 16 March, all retail shops were also closed and all services in all areas of religious worship of any religion or dogma were suspended. Supermarkets, pharmacies, food outlets that offer take-away and delivery only, as well as some other businesses, remained open. On 18 and 19 March, the government announced a series of economic measures of more than 10 billion euros to support the economy, businesses and employees.

On 22 March, the Greek authorities announced significant restrictions on all nonessential transport and movement across the country, starting from 6 a.m. on 23 March. Movement outside the house is permitted only for specific reasons that include moving to or from the workplace, shopping for food or medicine, going to the bank, visiting a doctor or assisting a person in need of help and walking a pet or exercising outside individually or in pairs. Citizens leaving their home are required to carry their police ID or passport, as well as some type of attestation depending on the purpose of travel. All passenger flights to and from Italy, Spain, Albania, North Macedonia, Turkey, the United Kingdom, the Netherlands and Germany are suspended until 15 May, and land borders with Albania, North Macedonia and Turkey are closed, with exemptions for cargo and sanitary transports, among others.

The measures put in place in Greece are some of the most proactive and strict in Europe and have been hailed internationally for slowing the spread of the disease and keeping the number of deaths among the lowest in Europe.

=== Italy ===
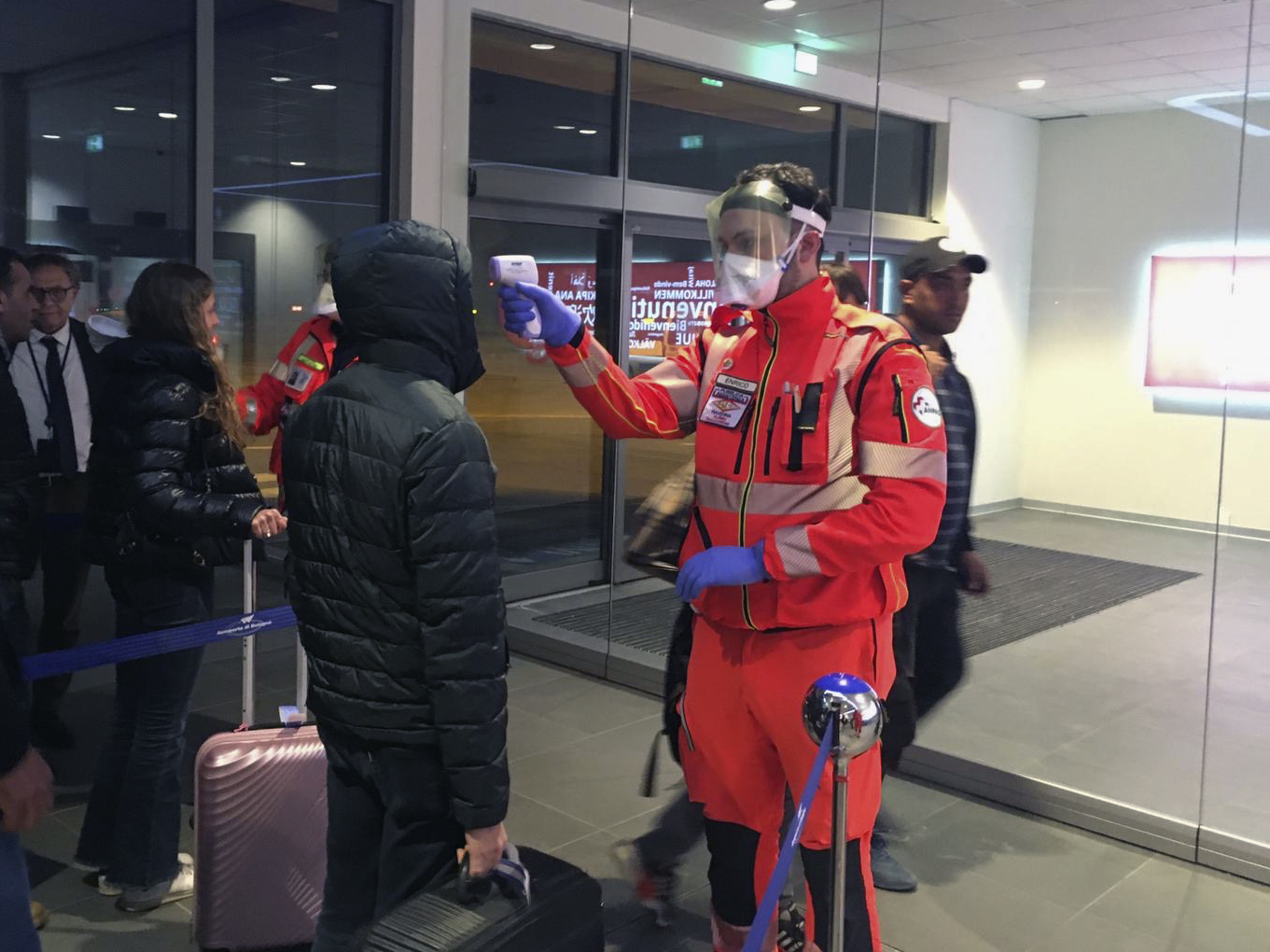
Civil Protection volunteers carrying out health checks at the Guglielmo Marconi Airport in Bologna

The outbreak was confirmed to have spread to Italy on 31 January 2020, when two Chinese tourists tested positive for SARS-CoV-2 in Rome. In response, the Italian government suspended all flights to and from China and declared a state of emergency, with Prime Minister Giuseppe Conte stating that Italy is the first EU country to take this precautionary measure. On 31 January, the Italian Council of Ministers appointed Angelo Borrelli, head of the Civil Protection, as Special Commissioner for the COVID-19 Emergency. An unassociated cluster of COVID-19 cases was later further detected starting with 16 confirmed cases in Lombardy on 21 February, an additional 60 cases on 22 February, and Italy's first deaths reported on the same day.

The Ministry of Health announced new guidelines for reporting cases on 27 February in response to the previous blanket testing that caused case numbers to surge and inflamed public panic. It would no longer report asymptomatic cases (swabs taken from patients which tested positive but were not showing symptoms) which counted as 40 to 50% of all reported cases at the time. These people would undergo isolation at home and would be followed up with new tests until they were negative.

On 22 February, the Italian Council of Ministers announced a new decree law to contain the outbreak, including quarantining more than 50,000 people from 11 different municipalities in northern Italy. Prime Minister Giuseppe Conte said "In the outbreak areas, entry and exit will not be provided. Suspension of work activities and sport events has already been ordered in those areas." Punishments for violating of the lockdown range from a fine of 206 euros to 3 months imprisonment. Italian military and law enforcement agencies were instructed to secure and implement the lockdown.

On 3 March, Chinese authorities reported that on 1 and 2 March, eight people who had returned to the county of Qingtian, in East China's Zhejiang province, had the virus. All eight appear to have acquired COVID-19 in the northern town of Bergamo, a virus-ravaged municipality, where they had worked at a restaurant, Qingtian officials said. Chinese authorities called these "backflow cases" — virus carriers who contract the disease outside China, then bring it back to their homeland.

On 4 March, the Italian government ordered the full closure of all schools and universities nationwide as Italy reached 100 deaths. Additionally, all major sporting events, including Serie A football matches, would be held behind closed doors until April. On 9 March, all sport was suspended completely for at least one month.

On 21 February, at least ten towns in the Lombardy and Veneto regions of Italy, with a total population of 50,000, were locked down in quarantine procedure following an outbreak in Codogno in Lombardy. Police mandated a curfew closing all public buildings and controlling access through police checkpoints to the so-called 'red zone' which is enforced by penalties for violations ranging from a €206 fine to three months of imprisonment against trespassers who are not health or supply workers. The government of Giuseppe Conte said that sending in the armed forces to enforce the lockdown was a possibility. The governor of Basilicata, Vito Bardi, instituted a mandatory 14-day quarantine for people arriving from areas in northern Italy affected by the outbreak on 24 February. On the same day, 500 extra police officers were assigned to patrol the quarantined areas in Lodi and Veneto.

On the morning of 8 March 2020, Conte said that much of Italy's northern territories, including Milan and Venice, would be quarantined within their region. Conte said the country was locking down all of the populous Lombardy region, with movement restrictions applying to about 16 million people. This will be the most aggressive response taken in any region beyond China, and will paralyse the wealthiest parts of the country as Italy attempts to constrain the rapid spread of the disease. On 8 March 2020, there have been 7,375 confirmed cases, and 366 deaths in Italy.

On the evening of 9 March 2020, the quarantine was expanded to all of Italy.

==== Criticism against Italian government's responses ====
Italy's government has drawn criticism from scientists and WHO, for its decision to suspend direct flights to mainland China that while sounding "tough" on paper, was ineffective as "people can still arrive from risk areas via indirect routes." Walter Ricciardi, professor of Hygiene and Public Health at the Università Cattolica del Sacro Cuore in Rome and a member of the European Advisory Committee on Health Research has said "Italy was wrong, closing flights from China is of no use when there are indirect ones."

Italy's government has also been criticised for not testing or enforcing lockdowns sufficiently in some regions, sending mixed messages, and downplaying the severity of the situation. Criticism followed disclosures by Italian Prime Minister Giuseppe Conte that protocols had not been followed at the hospital in Codogno, Lombardy that treated "patient 1" which "certainly contributed to the spread" of the virus in Italy, with Conte responding to inquiries by journalists on what protocol was broken with "This is not the time for controversy." In response to a statement by Conte that the central government may need to "revoke regional health policy powers," President of Lombardy Attilio Fontana called Conte's statement "fascist" and "talking nonsense."

On 8 March, plans by the government to quarantine 16 million people in Northern Italy were leaked early by a national newspaper, causing thousands of people to flee the region before it took place. Conte condemned the leak, calling it "unacceptable".

=== Spain ===
On 31 January 2020, the first case was confirmed when a tourist tested positive for SARS-CoV-2 in La Gomera, Spain. On 14 March, due to the increased number of cases, Spanish Prime Minister Pedro Sánchez declared a state of alarm, placing all citizens in quarantine except for those working in healthcare or other vital activities, closing all non-critical businesses, and only allowing citizens to go outside for activities such as grocery shopping or walking a pet.

==== Criticism against Spanish government's responses ====
The Spanish government has received criticism for its perceived slow response to the pandemic, as it did not prevent any concentrations until 11 March when there already were 1,646 infected. The large march in Madrid for International Women's Day (8 March), which was attended by around 120,000 people received special criticism, as this event was promoted and attended by members of the government such as Irene Montero who was later confirmed to be infected.

=== United Kingdom ===
The nature of devolution in the United Kingdom meant that each of the four countries of the UK had its own response to COVID-19 with different rules and restrictions at different times and many of the UK government actions only applying to England.

On 24 March 2020, the United Kingdom brought in "some of the most far-reaching curbs on personal freedom ever introduced" in peacetime, including a three-week lockdown of the country. This included a ban on public gatherings of more than two people (excluding those one lives with) and the closing down of all non-essential businesses.

==== Scotland ====
The first case of COVID-19 in Scotland was confirmed on 1 March with the first death of someone with COVID-19 occurring 12 days later. The following week, on 20 March, the Scottish government instructed a number of businesses to close, including pubs, cafes, cinemas and bingo halls. On 21 May, First Minister Nicola Sturgeon outlined a four-phase "route map" for easing lockdown restrictions in Scotland to take effect from 28 May subject to the number of new cases of COVID-19 continuing to fall.

=== Other countries and territories ===
- Albania
- Andorra
- Austria
- Belarus
- Belgium
- Bosnia and Herzegovina
- Bulgaria
- Croatia
- Czech Republic
- Denmark
- Donetsk People's Republic
- Estonia
- Faroe Islands
- Finland
- Gibraltar
- Guernsey
- Hungary
- Iceland
- Ireland
- Isle of Man
- Jersey
- Kosovo
- Latvia
- Liechtenstein
- Luhansk People's Republic
- Luxembourg
- Malta
- Moldova
- Monaco
- Montenegro
- Netherlands
- North Macedonia
- Norway
- Poland
- Portugal
- Romania
- Russia
- San Marino
- Serbia
- Slovakia
- Slovenia
- Sweden
- Switzerland
- Ukraine
- Vatican City

== North America ==
=== Costa Rica ===
Since the start of the pandemic, the Ministry of Health, together with the Government, were in charge of informing the general population through a daily press conference. By 6 March, the first confirmed case of COVID-19 was registered after several results obtained by INCIENSA (Costa Rican Institute of Research and Teaching in Nutrition and Health). The 49-year-old American woman was isolated, along with her husband in a San José lodging. There were 2 previous suspected cases under investigation. The positive patient arrived with her husband on Sunday, 1 March without symptoms, at the Juan Santamaría airport, they visited Alajuela and Puntarenas, so investigations were carried out from these areas to follow up on contacts, as well as 152 people traveling on the flight that brought them to the country.

On 9 March, due to the nine confirmed cases of COVID-19, the Ministry of Health in coordination with the National Emergency Commission (CNE) reported that from 10 March, events and concentration activities are canceled massive, both free and paid, while teleworking for public institutions is instructed through the Presidential Directive.

President Carlos Alvarado Quesada and Minister of Health Daniel Salas announced, on 12 March, preventive closings to educational centers at risk, the reduction in 50% of the approved capacity of public meeting spaces and suspension of trips abroad for public employees. A telephone line is created for inquiries about COVID-19.

On 15 March, the Ministry of Health made the decision to instruct a total lockdown placing all citizens in quarantine except for those working in healthcare and delivery restaurant and food services. The closure of bars, clubs and casinos and the amusement park was informed. By this date 35 confirmed cases of COVID-19 are registered in the nation.

On 16 March, The Government declares a state of National Emergency, prevents the arrival of foreigners and lessons are suspended in all schools. Costa Ricans and residents who entered the country will have to carry out mandatory preventive isolation for 14 days. 41 cases are confirmed.

The first death of a patient confirmed by COVID-19 is recorded by 18 March. This is an 87-year-old man who was hospitalized in intensive care at the Alajuela Hospital.

By 31 March, were registered 8 in intensive care and 347 people were infected. 4 people recovered.

=== United States ===
On 28 January 2020, the federal government publicly released its approach to COVID-19 testing. Despite this, the U.S. testing effort was slow, obscuring the extent of the outbreak. Many of the 160,000 test kits produced in February were found to be defective and were not used. Academic laboratories, hospitals and private companies were not allowed to use their own tests until 29 February, when the FDA started issuing approvals for them. Initially, there were eligibility restrictions for receiving a COVID-19 test (based on recent international travel, hospitalization for respiratory illness, or contact with another person already diagnosed with COVID-19). By 27 February 2020, fewer than 4,000 tests had been conducted in the United States. On March 5, 2020, the CDC relaxed its restrictions, allowing doctors to decide whom to test; a week later, nearly 14,000 tests had been performed. Federal funding was used to run 41 "community-based testing sites" (CBTS), but the federal government said it would stop this funding on 10 April; as a result of that decision, some of these testing sites were expected to close, shifting demand to hospitals. Those that remain open will likely be funded by states.

On 31 January 2020, President Donald Trump issued a proclamation limiting entry into the United States, as immigrants or nonimmigrants, of all aliens who were physically present within the People's Republic of China, excluding the Special Administrative Regions of Hong Kong and Macau, during the 14-day period preceding their entry or attempted entry into the United States.

The first six confirmed deaths in the United States were reported in late February 2020 in the Pacific Northwest state of Washington. By 8 March 2020, there were 22 U.S. deaths and over 500 reported cases. A month later, on 8 April, there were 14,000 U.S. deaths and over 430,000 reported cases.

The U.S. federal government's health inspectors surveyed 323 hospitals in late March, reporting "severe shortages" of test supplies, "widespread shortages" of PPE, and other strained resources due to extended patient stays while awaiting test results.

=== Other countries and territories ===
- Anguilla
- Antigua and Barbuda
- Aruba
- Bahamas
- Barbados
- Belize
- Bermuda
- Bonaire
- British Virgin Islands
- Canada
- Cayman Islands
- Cuba
- Curaçao
- Dominica
- Dominican Republic
- El Salvador
- Greenland
- Grenada
- Guadeloupe
- Guatemala
- Haiti
- Honduras
- Jamaica
- Martinique
- Mexico
- Montserrat
- Nicaragua
- Panama
- Saba
- Saint Barthélemy
- Saint Kitts and Nevis
- Saint Lucia
- Saint Martin
- Saint Pierre and Miquelon
- Saint Vincent and the Grenadines
- Sint Eustatius
- Sint Maarten
- Trinidad and Tobago
- Turks and Caicos Islands

== Oceania ==
=== Australia ===
On 13 March 2020, the National Cabinet, a form of national crisis cabinet akin to a war cabinet, was created following a meeting of the Council of Australian Governments (COAG). This is the first time such a cabinet has been proclaimed since World War II, and the only time in Australian history that a crisis cabinet has included state and territory leaders. The cabinet consists of the premiers and chief ministers of the Australian states and territories and meets weekly during the crisis. At its first meeting on 13 March, the National Cabinet announced that gatherings of more than 500 people should be cancelled from 15 March. Schools, universities, workplaces, public transport and airports were not included in this recommendation. Prime Minister Morrison also announced that he intended to attend a Rugby League match on 14 March; "I do still plan to go to the football on Saturday" but later decided against attending the match.

On 29 March, the Cabinet agreed to stricter limits to apply from midnight on 30 March: a limit on both indoor and outdoor gatherings of two people except weddings (5) and funerals (10), and people of the same household or family; strong guidance to all Australians is to stay home unless for necessary shopping, health care, exercise, and work and study that can't be done remotely; public playgrounds, skate parks and outside gyms to be closed. It was left to individual states to enforce these guidelines. They also agreed to a moratorium on evictions for six months for both commercial and residential tenancies suffering financial distress.

On 2 April 2020, the Federal government announced the temporary provision of free childcare so that people could continue working, and to prevent closure of childcare centres. The Government paid half each centre's operating costs. The free childcare ended on 12 July, and the previous Child Care Subsidy was reintroduced.

=== Fiji ===
At the beginning of February, the Government of Fiji announced a travel ban to China. As the disease started spreading to other countries, Fiji extended the travel ban to Italy, Iran and South Korea.

On 19 March, Fiji confirmed its first case of COVID-19 in Lautoka. As a precautionary measure, the Government of Fiji announced the lockdown of the city until 7 April 2020 and the travel ban was further extended to the United States and the whole of Europe including the United Kingdom. On 26 March, the country closed its main international airport in Nadi and all local shipping services was ceased. Later on 2 April, the Government announced a lockdown of Suva, after confirmed cases in the capital.

As cases rose, Prime Minister Voreqe Bainimarama announced a nationwide curfew from 8pm to 5am and social gatherings was banned. Schools and non-essential services were closed and the public was advised to stay at home and practice good hygiene.

=== New Zealand ===
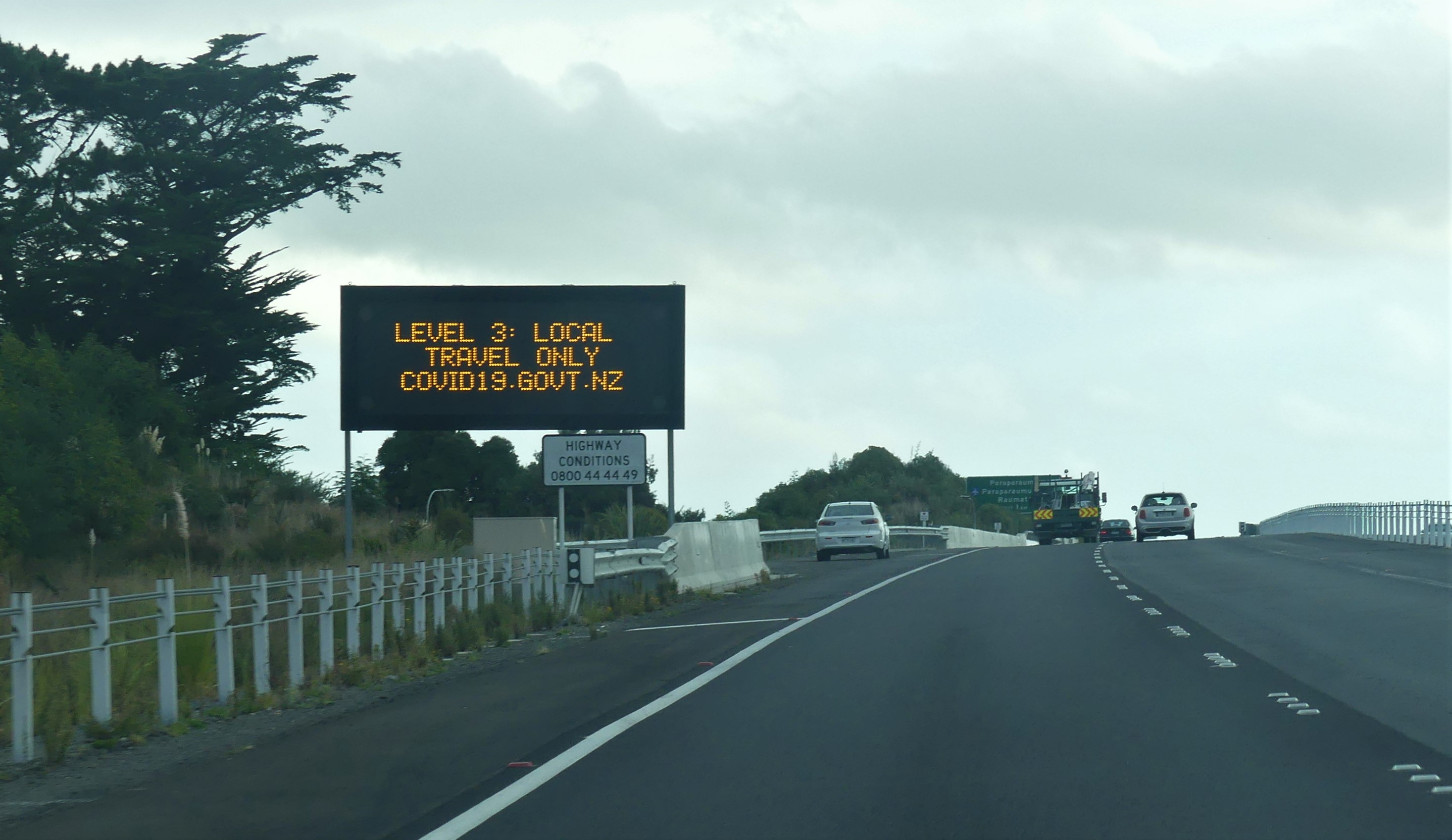
A traffic management sign in Paraparaumu indicating COVID-19 alert level 3 in April 2020

The New Zealand Government responded to the COVID-19 pandemic in New Zealand in various ways. In early February 2020, the Government imposed travel restrictions on China in response to the global COVID-19 pandemic originating in Wuhan and also repatriated citizens and residents from Wuhan. Following the country's first case, which originated in Iran, the Government imposed travel restrictions on Iran.

In response to rising cases, Prime Minister Jacinda Ardern closed the country's borders to non-citizens and non-residents on 19 March 2020. On 21 March, the Government introduced a four-tier alert level system, which placed much of the country's population and economy into lockdown from 25 March. Due to the success of the Government's elimination strategy in reducing the spread of COVID-19, most lockdown and social distancing restrictions were lifted by 8 June 2020. However, border restrictions remained in force. On 13 May, the Government passed the controversial COVID-19 Public Health Response Act 2020 which entrenched the Government's lockdown restrictions.

On 11 August 2020, the Government reinstated lockdown restrictions in Auckland following a second outbreak of community transmissions. Due to successful efforts to reduce community transmissions, lockdown restrictions were eliminated by 7 October. In early November, the Government required travellers entering New Zealand to book a place in managed isolation and quarantine (MIQ) prior to travelling to the country. On 12 December 2020, the Government announced plans to establish travel bubbles with the Cook Islands and Australia in 2021.

=== Other countries and territories ===
- French Polynesia
- New Caledonia
- Papua New Guinea

== South America ==
=== Brazil ===
Brazilian president Jair Bolsonaro was criticized due to "lax handling" of the outbreak and after calling it a "fantasy". His lack of action has also prompted many protests across the country since 18 March 2020. Days before, on 15 March, Bolsonaro received harsh criticism after attending a pro-government demonstration in Brasília on which he had physical contact with more than two hundred people, against the recommendations of his own Minister of Health. Following the event, the president of the Brazilian Chamber of Deputies, Rodrigo Maia, said that Bolsonaro's acts were an "attack on public health", going against his own government guidelines, while Davi Alcolumbre, president of the Brazilian Senate, classified Bolsonaro's behaviour as "inconsequential". The Brazilian Ministry of Health has also been criticized for not providing enough test kits, which may muddle the efforts to contain the outbreak in the country.

=== Other countries and territories ===
- Argentina
- Bolivia
- Chile
- Colombia
- Ecuador
- Falkland Islands
- French Guiana
- Guyana
- Paraguay
- Peru
- Suriname
- Uruguay
- Venezuela

== Debate ==
The response to the pandemic has resulted in unprecedented expansion of government power. Advocates of small government worry that the state will be reluctant to give up that power once the crisis is over, as has often been the case historically.

== See also ==
- List of COVID-19 pandemic legislation
- COVID-19 lockdowns
- Economic impact of the COVID-19 pandemic#Economic recovery programmes
- Impact of the COVID-19 pandemic on sports
- Impact of the COVID-19 pandemic on religion
- Impact of the COVID-19 pandemic on education
- International aid related to the COVID-19 pandemic
