= Michael Calvey =

American businessman

- Born: October 3, 1967 (age 59); Wisconsin
- Occupations: Entrepreneur, investor
- Known for: Co-founder and managing partner of Baring Vostok Capital Partners
- Relatives: Kevin Calvey (brother)

Michael Calvey (born October 3, 1967) is an American businessman known for his investments in Russia. Calvey was a co-founder of Baring Vostok, an independent private equity firm focused on investments in Russia and the Commonwealth of Independent States.

In 2019, following a corporate dispute with Russian shareholders in Vostochny Bank, Calvey was arrested by the Russian Federal Security Service (FSB) in a high-profile case that The New York Times described as being based on “bogus charges”. After a lengthy trial, a Russian judge in 2021 found Calvey guilty of misappropriation and issued him a suspended (probationary) sentence of 5.5 years. In 2024, Calvey's conviction was vacated, clearing his record.

His case was widely publicized in Russia and the world. Calvey authored a best-selling memoir, Odyssey Moscow: One American's Journey from Russia Optimist to Prisoner of the State, recounting these events.

In 2022, Calvey left Russia.

== Biography ==
Calvey was born in 1967 in Wisconsin and grew up in Oklahoma. His elder brother Kevin Calvey is an Oklahoma attorney and Republican politician.

Calvey has Bachelor of Business degree from the University of Oklahoma, and Master of Finance degree from the London School of Economics. According to Calvey, he planned to go into politics and become Governor of Oklahoma someday, but instead ended up on Wall Street after completing his studies.

Calvey worked on mergers and acquisitions at Salomon Brothers, before taking a position in energy project finance, focusing on countries of the former Soviet Union at the European Bank for Reconstruction and Development (ERBD). In a 2019 interview, Calvey said that his interest in Eastern Europe was influenced by the collapse of the Berlin Wall in 1989. Calvey noted that the 1991 Soviet coup d'état attempt took place just a week before he was supposed to start working in Russia. The coup occurred while he was on holiday, climbing the Matterhorn in the Alps and when he returned three days later, pictures of the coup inspired his move. Calvey moved to Moscow in 1994 to set up Baring Vostok, which later discovered early-stage start-ups, including future tech companies like search and mobility pioneer Yandex and digital bank Tinkoff Bank. Calvey is fluent in Russian.

=== Baring Vostok Capital Partners ===
Calvey co-founded Baring Vostok in 1994, with the firm becoming known for making early-stage investments in Russian companies largely from the tech and consumer-facing sectors. As of 2019, Baring Vostok launched 6 funds totaling $3.7 billion. By 2021, the firm has reportedly invested almost $3 billion in 80 companies, including some of Russia’s most valuable technology companies such as Tinkoff Bank, Ozon, FGI Wireless (Beeline), CTC Media, Avito.ru, 1C Company, Ivi.ru, and CarPrice. In Russia, Baring Vostok was best known for its investment in Yandex: the fund returned over $1 billion from the initial purchase of 35% share in 2000 for $5.28 million.

The New York Times described Calvey as a longstanding proponent of investment opportunities in Russia. Anatoly Chubais, a former Russian Deputy Prime Minister and a key figure in Russia’s post-Soviet market reforms, credited Calvey with personally attracting billions of dollars of investment into the country. According to Bloomberg, "Calvey became a legend in the Russian market, in part because of his reputed aversion to any kind of foul play and focus on industries and companies unlikely to attract the attention of Russia’s authorities."

=== Baring Vostok embezzlement case ===
Following a merger of Vostochny Bank (owned by Baring Vostok funds) with Uniastrum Bank in 2017, the merged entity (still named Vostochny Bank) was audited by the Russian Central Bank. Vostochny was ordered to make provisions of extra 19.6 billion Roubles by the Russian Central Bank following the audit, which found that 85% of the provisions were caused by actions “resembling asset stripping” by the owners of Uniastrum Bank in the three months prior to the merger with Vostochny.

Calvey was arrested on February 14, 2019, with three other Baring Vostok executives, on suspicion of allegedly embezzling 2.5 billion rubles (US$38 million) from the Russian Vostochny Bank. On February 21, Russian state prosecutors formally charged him with fraud. The criminal case was initiated on the basis of a statement from Sherzod Yusupov, a minority shareholder of Vostochny Bank. At the time of the allegations, Calvey's Baring Vostok had a majority stake of 52.5% in Vostochny Bank. Avetisyan has been described as a friend of the son of Nikolai Patrushev, former Director of the FSB and secretary of Putin's Security Council. Calvey was suing Avetisyan in a separate court case in London, and winning, and Calvey maintains the charges against him were trumped up by Avetisyan who used his connections to have Calvey arrested and thus unable to effectively defend himself in the London case. On February 22, 2019, Radio Echo of Moscow interviewed BBC Russian Service correspondent Olga Shamina, who claimed that the case against Calvey is based on two documents described in a BBC Russian Service publication on its website. One is said to be a statement by Vostochny Bank minority shareholder Sherzod Yusupov, the other an assessment by lawyers in Luxembourg commissioned by Artem Avetisyan.

Prior to the charges being launched in Russia, the shareholders of Vostochny Bank had been engaged in an arbitration dispute over terms of the merger agreement between the Vostochny and Uniastrum shareholders. In March 2019, the London Court of International Arbitration ruled that attempts made by Mr. Avetisyan to obtain a further 10% of the bank via the call option violated arbitration agreements.

Calvey claimed the allegations were unfounded and linked the criminal investigation against him to a corporate dispute he had with other shareholders of Vostochny Bank. Later the shareholders entered into a settlement agreement and publicly stated that their shareholder dispute was not related to the criminal investigation. After signing the settlement agreement, Baring Vostok returned 2.5 billion rubles to Vostochny Bank.

Calvey was held in Matrosskaya Tishina ("Seaman's Silence Prison"), the facility notorious for poor conditions and treatment — it is the same prison where lawyer Sergei Magnitsky was detained and died under mysterious circumstances. Calvey's case was assigned to Artur Karpov, a judge at the Basmanny District Court whose history included dismissing several appeals requesting an investigation into Sergei Magnitsky's death. U.S. government officials under both the Trump and Biden administrations commented publicly that the case was a commercial dispute that shouldn’t be resolved in criminal courts, and that the arrest of Calvey was a major barrier to improving U.S.-Russian business relations.

In April 2019, Calvey was released to a restricted form of house arrest, although a number of colleagues remained in prison. House arrest was lifted in December 2020 and replaced with other restrictions.

In August 2021, the Meshchansky District Court of Moscow found Calvey guilty of misappropriating 2.5 billion rubles. The court imposed a 5.5-year suspended sentence, meaning he was confined to his home. His co-defendants also received suspended sentences ranging from 42 to 60 months. Calvey soon after appealed the judgment maintaining his innocence.

Observers have called the sentence a victory under the circumstances, with sources including Russia’s business ombudsman Boris Titov saying the decision was an attempt by Russian law enforcement to “save face."

In January 2022 the appellate court lifted the Moscow Meshchansky district court home restriction. From that date, Calvey was allowed to leave Russia and travel abroad. On April 5, 2024, Calvey’s conviction was vacated and nullified, removing Calvey's status of being a convicted person. Following Russia's 2022 invasion of Ukraine, Baring Vostok hastily divested its Russian investments, resulting in billions of dollars in losses.

Calvey's case is discussed in Midnight in Moscow: A Memoir from the Front Lines of Russia’s War Against the West, by former U.S. Ambassador to Russia John J Sullivan, as an example of an unlawful case against a prominent international investor. Sullivan writes: “The Russian Government had arrested the most successful and prominent U.S. business leader and investor in Russia, Michael Calvey, on a phoney charge".

=== Post-Russia ===
Calvey is currently the Chairman of Baring Ventures, a global private equity firm. Among other things Calvey is fostering internet startups, elsewhere in the world, employing young tech talent that fled Russia.

Michael Calvey's memoir Odyssey Moscow: One American's Journey from Russia Optimist to Prisoner of the State was published in March 2025 by The History Press. The memoir recounts Michael Calvey’s three decades as an investor in Russia, reflecting on the country's changing political and economic climate and the circumstances leading up to his arrest in 2019, and subsequent nullification of his conviction in 2024. In May 2025, Odyssey Moscow ranked #15 on the USA Today Bestseller list. A review in Kirkus Reviews discussed Calvey’s “intimate, gripping writing style,” saying it paints “an accessible, troubling portrait of a nation increasingly reliant on authoritarian, state-sanctioned violence and intimidation”.

== See also ==
- List of American people imprisoned in Russia
