= Sovcombank =

Russian commercial bank

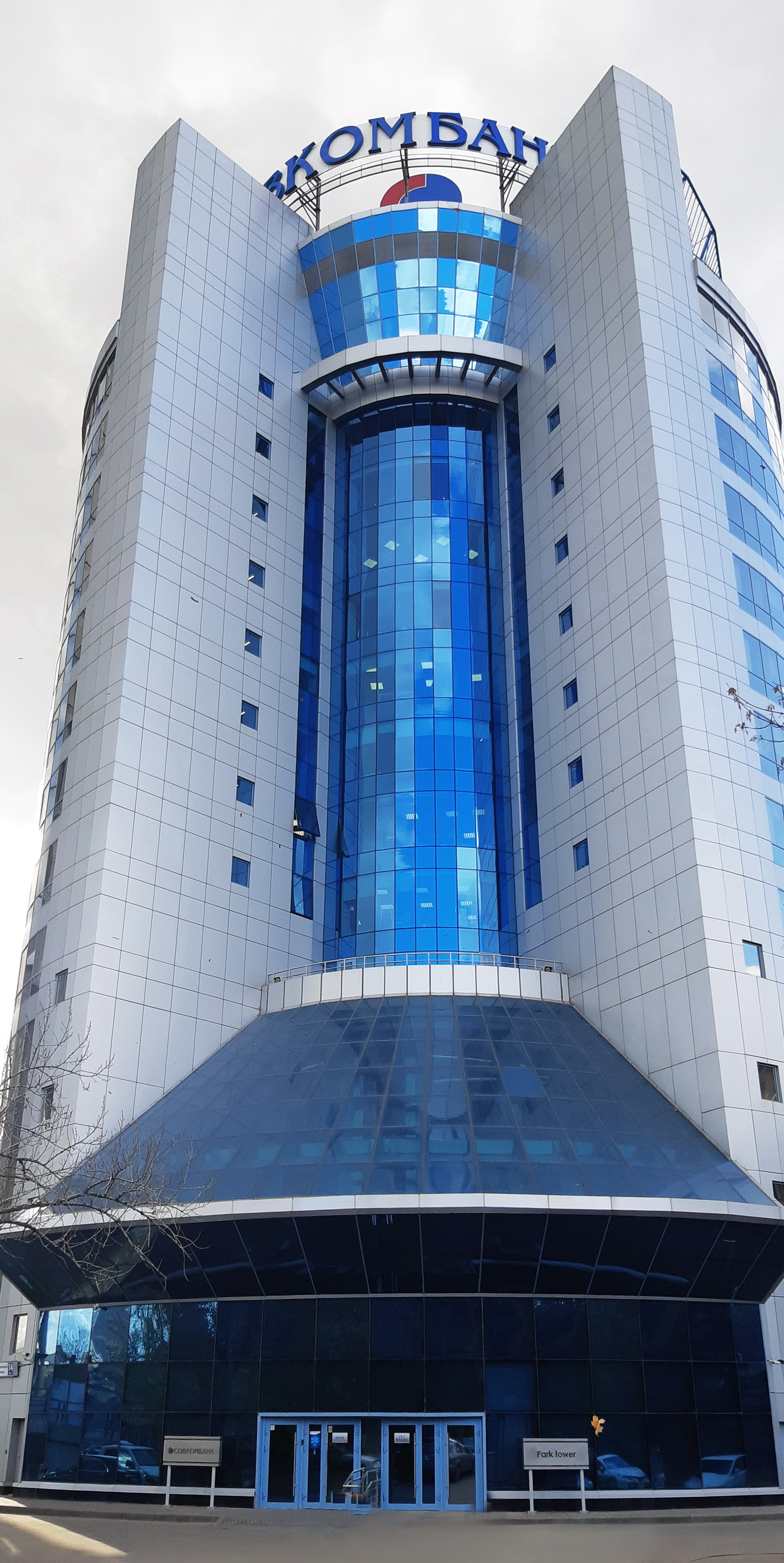
- Formerly: Buycombank
- Type: Public
- Traded as: MCX: SVCB
- Industry: Banking
- Founded: 1990; 36 years ago
- Headquarters: Kostroma, Russia
- Key people: Sergey Khotimskiy; Dmitry Gusev
- Products: Financial services
- Operating income: 169,971,000,000 Russian ruble (2025)
- Net income: RUB 39.2 billion (2020)
- Total assets: RUB 1483.36 billion (2020)
- Total equity: RUB 188.259 billion (2020)
- Owner: Sovco Capital Partners (Russia)
- Website: sovcombank.ru/en/about/info

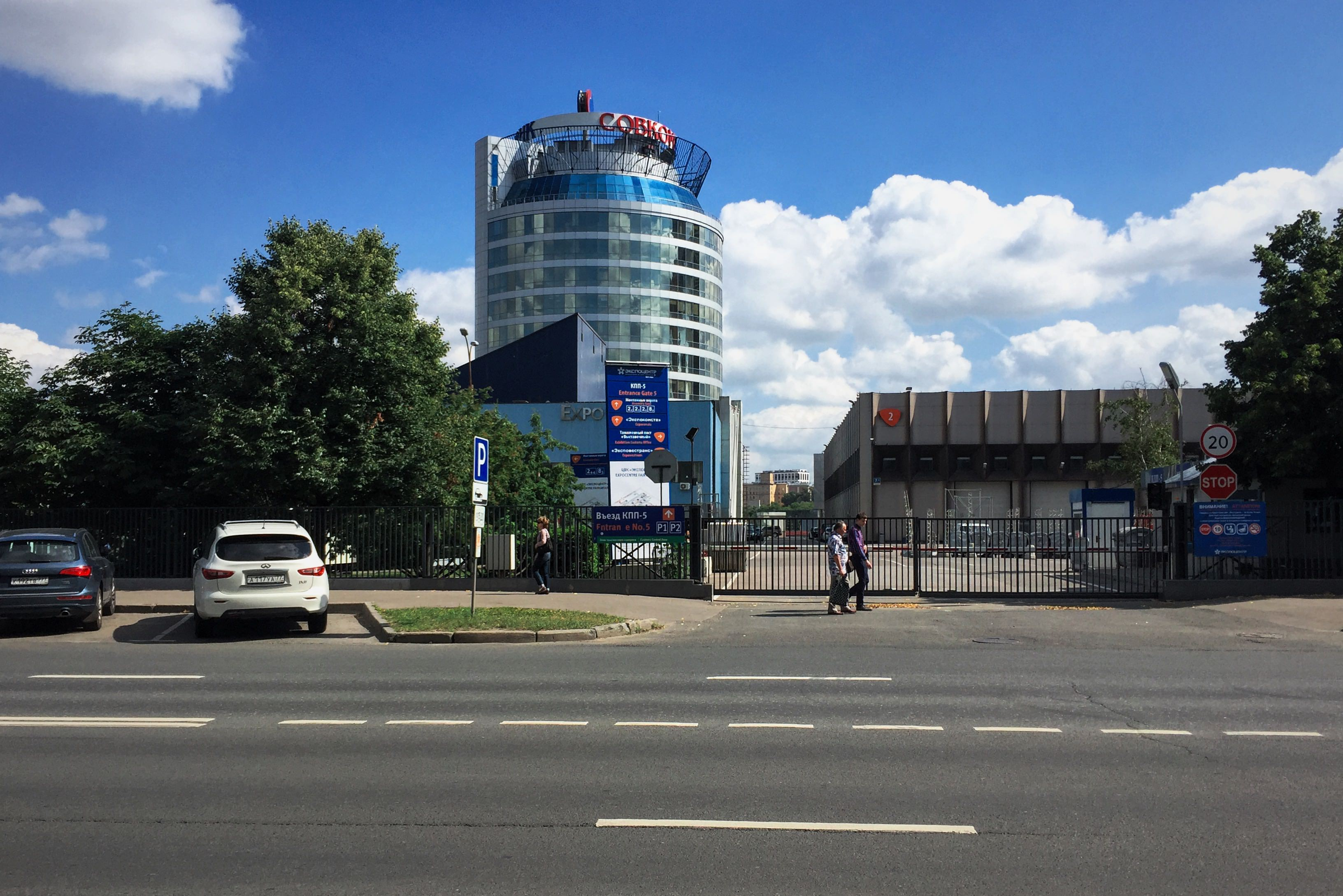
Sovcombank building, Moscow

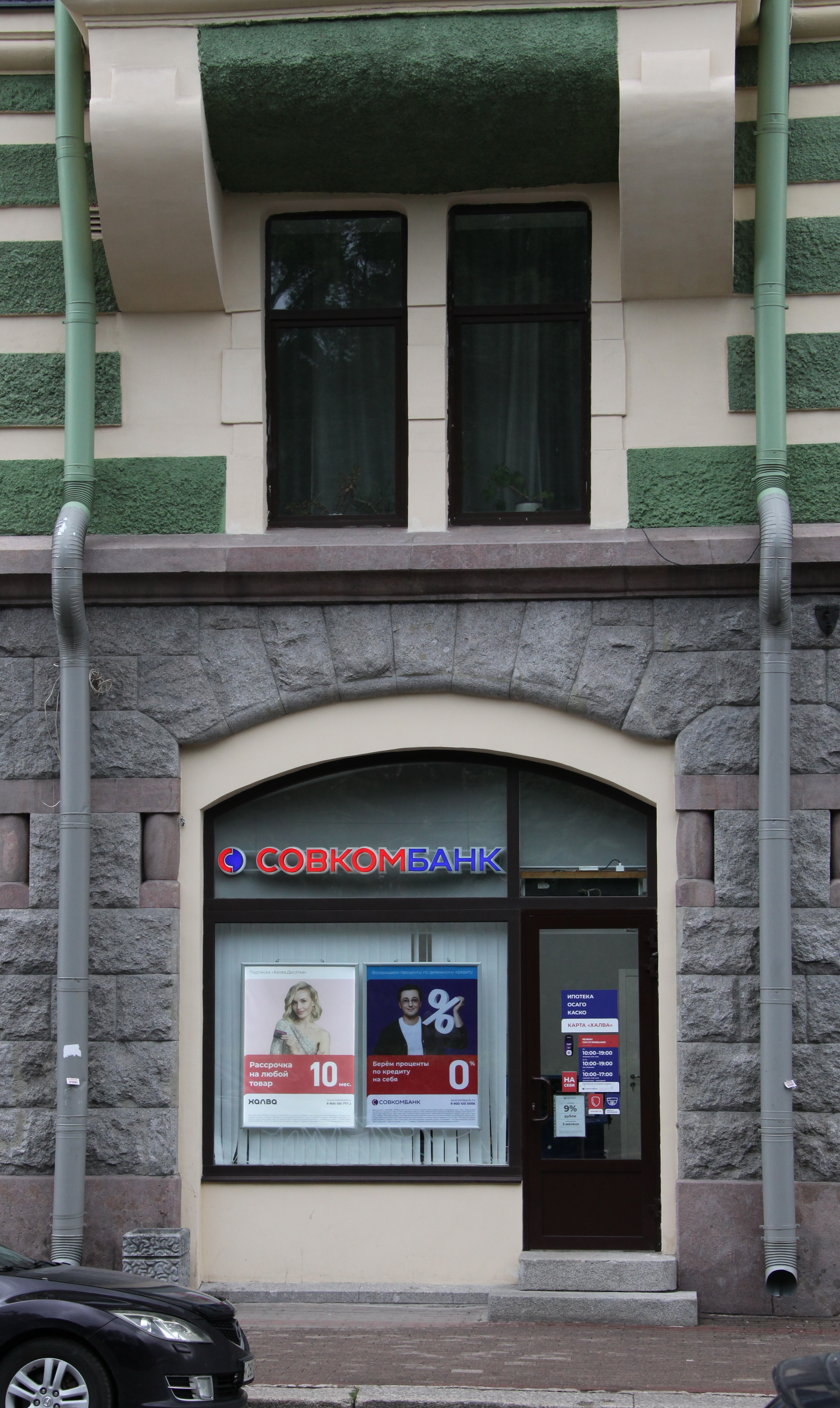
Sovcombank office (Lenin Avenue in Vyborg)

Sovcombank (Public Joint-Stock Company "Sovcombank", Russian: Совкомбанк) is a Russian privately owned universal bank included in the list of 13 systemically important Russian banks. In terms of assets, it ranks 9th among Russian banks (1,483 billion rubles).

From 1990 its initial name was Buycombank (after former headquarters town Buy in Kostroma region) before been bought and rebranded into Sovcombank and his partners in February 2003.

The main owner of Sovcombank (86.5%) is the Russia-based company JSC Sovco Capital Partners, owned by private Russian shareholders, notably (as of August 2020) brothers Dmitry and Sergey Khotimsky who own together 37% of Sovco Capital Partners. Minority shareholders of Sovcombank include Public Investment Fund of Saudi Arabia (3.3%), Russia-China Investment Fund (2.0%) and Russia-Japan Investment Fund (1.3%) After operating within Netherlands and Luxembourg jurisdiction, from September 2021 the holding company of Russian shareholders of Sovcombank was reregistered in special administrative region of Oktyabrsky island of Kaliningrad oblast in Russia.

The bank is subject to international sanctions since February 24, 2022 in response to Russia's invasion of Ukraine.

== History ==
Sovcombank was registered on November 1, 1990, in the Buy town, Kostroma Oblast. It was originally known as Buykombank.

In 2002, Buykombank was acquired by Sergey Khotimsky and Mikhail and Vasily Klyukin brothers. In February 2003 the bank was renamed Sovcombank ("Modern Commercial Bank"). The head office was relocated to Kostroma.

In September 2007, the shareholder of Sovcombank became the international investment company from the Netherlands TBIC Financial Services BV (TBIF). As a result of this transaction, Sovcombank turned out to be the only owner of TBIF assets in Russia represented by the Siberian Arch Credit Network (about a thousand salespies). Under the terms of the transaction, the Kardan TBIF subsidiary received 50% of the shares in Sovcombank, making 100% of the Arch and about $65 million. Khotimsky and partners issued their shares through the Netherlands Sovco Capital Partners.

In May 2012, TBIF sold its share to other Sovkombank shareholders, having received €123 million and earned €59 million.

At the end of 2015, Pavel Fuks sold his part (21.83%) in Sovcombank, which was estimated at $80 million.

In early 2019, another additional issue was held, as a result of which the authorized capital of Sovcombank increased by ₽ 100 million to ₽ 1.97 billion. Shares were redeemed by Russian Direct Investment Fund and Ayar International Investment Company (Saudi Arabia), which were already shareholders, as well as new investors — Bahrain Mumtalakat Holding and the Russian-Japanese investment fund. In 2019, bank took part in UN initiative for responsible financial activities.

In 2020, Sovcombank started preparations for the IPO, its shareholders approved listing on the Moscow Stock Exchange. Goldman Sachs, JP Morgan and Morgan Stanley were chosen as the placement managers.

In the 2020 Bank of Russia included Sovcombank into a list of systemically significant banks.

In 2021 Sovcombank closed a deal to buy Vostochny Bank from its key shareholders - Baring Vostok Fund, Finvision Company and Sherzod Yusupov. In December 2021 Sovcombank signed a binding agreement on the purchase of an insurance division “CiV Life” from HDI International AG, affiliate of the Talanx group. The deal was previewed to be closed in the first quarter of 2022.

In February 2022 Sovcombank became the first Russian bank launching 4-days workweek.

In February 2022 Sovcombank acquired 31% of Vitabank for further use of its licence to develop payment services. Another 54% of shares of Vitabank were bought by Kirill Sokolov, Sovcombank's ex-deputy chairman of the board. The stake of "Kirov Leningradsky grain processing plant" has been subsequently decreased from 93,76% to 8,76%.

In December 2023, after repeated postponements, Sovcombank announced an IPO on the Moscow Exchange. 1 billion shares of additional issue were placed (about 5% of the capital). The placement took place at the upper limit of the price range at 11.5 rubles per share. A total of 11.5 billion rubles were raised. Trading on the Moscow Exchange began on December 15, tickers SVCB and ISIN RU000A0ZZAC4. This is the bank's first IPO in Russia since 2015 and the first IPO of a company under sanctions.

In February 2024, Sovcombank announced the upcoming purchase of Home Credit Bank. This is one of the leaders in the Russian consumer lending market with an equity capital of 53 billion rubles. The transaction is planned to be carried out in two stages: 51% in 2024 in exchange for shares of Sovcombank’s additional issue and 49% in 2024-2025 for cash.

== Sanctions ==
On February 24, 2022, in response to Russia's invasion of Ukraine, U.S. President Joe Biden announced additional economic sanctions against Russian individuals, companies and financial institutions, including Sovcombank and its subsidiaries. These sanctions freeze any of Sovcombank assets touching the U.S financial system and prohibit U.S. persons from dealing with the bank. As result, plastic cards issued by Sovcombank will remain active in Russia only, and any foreign exchange transactions will be unavailable to its clients.

== Key subsidiaries ==
=== Sovcombank Insurance ===
Sovcombank Insurance (until 2020 — Liberty Insuranse (Russia), Russian: Либерти Страхование). This company has been operating in the Russian insurance market since 1993 under the brands "Klass" (Russian: Класс) and "KIT Finance Insurance" (Russian: КИТ Финанс страхование). Liberty Insurance Group bought this company in 2013 and sold it to Sovcombank in 2020. In August 2024, after the purchase of Home Credit Bank, Home Credit Insurance joined Sovcombank Insurance. All obligations will be transferred to the merged structure.

=== Non-state pension fund ===
In the summer of 2024, Sovcombank launched a non-state pension fund with an authorized capital of 150 million rubles. The founder was Sovcombank Insurance. The fund is aimed at participating in the long-term savings program.

=== Sovcombank Life ===
Sovcombank Life (until 2021 — MetLife (Russia), Russian: МетЛайф). The company has been operating in the Russian life insurance market since 1994 under the brands AIG, Alico and Metlife. Sovcombank bought MetLife (Russia) in 2020 and renamed it in 2021.

=== Sovcombank Asset Management ===
Sovcombank Asset Management (until 2021 — Vostochny Capital Management Company, Russian: УК "Восточный Капитал"). Vostochny Capital Management Company was established in 2018 as a subsidiary of Vostochny Bank. At the end of May 2021, Sovcombank closed a deal to acquire 100% of Vostochny Bank (including Vostochny Capital Management Company).

=== Sovcombank Leasing ===
Sovcombank Leasing (until 2020 — Sollers-Finance, Russian: Соллерс-Финанс). The leasing company Sollers-Finance was established in 2008 as a subsidiary of Sollers OJSC. Since 2010 Sovcombank LLC become the co-owner of the company and in 2019 its become the sole owner of the company. In 2020, Sollers-Finance was renamed Sovcombank Leasing.

=== Sovcombank Factoring ===
Sovcombank Factoring (until 2018 — R.E.Factoring, Russian: Р.Е. Факторинг). The company has been operating in the Russian factoring market since 2013 under the brand Russian: Р.Е. Факторинг. Sovcombank bought R.E.Factoring in 2018 and renamed it in 2019. Sovcombank also bought the "National Factoring Company" factoring group from Uralsib Bank in 2021 and merged it with Sovcombank Factoring.

=== Sovcombank Technologies ===
Sovcombank Technologies is an IT company created by Sovcombank in 2021 to develop ecosystem for the Halva installment card project. The company is also involved in innovative developments using biometrics, chat bots, and conversational artificial intelligence. In January 2022, Sovcombank organized a co-working space for back office employees and Sovcombank Technologies. The base for coworking was a five-star hotel in Turkey on the Mediterranean coast.

== Contribution to global initiatives ==
Sovcombank pursues a policy of sustainable development and takes care of the social and environmental (ESG) aspects of its activities. Sovcombank participates in the United Nations Environment Program Finance Initiative (UNEP FI, since 2019), it has signed the Principles for Responsible Investment. In the same year, Sovcombank became a member of the UN Global Compact, a UN initiative aimed at promoting the social responsibility of business. Sovcombank was the first among Russian banks to support the recommendations of the Task Force on Climate Related Financial Disclosures (TCFD) and has committed to apply the recommendations to make the bank's ESG reporting even more transparent.

== Ratings ==
Fitch Ratings downgrade rating to "B" in March 2022 and then withdrew.

Standard & Poor's affirmed the "BB" foreign currency long terms credit rating of Sovcombank on January 15, 2021, outlook was revised to "positive" from "stable".

Moody's assigned "Ba1" rating to Sovcombank's proposed LPNs in January 2021.

ACRA upgraded Sovcombank to "AA-(RU)" and changed outlook to "stable" in April 2021.

Expert RA affirm rating "ruAA" and outlook "stable" in February 2022.
