= CarPrice =

Moscow-based technological start-up

- Type: Limited company
- Industry: Automotive industry
- Founded: June 2014
- Headquarters: Moscow, Russia
- Website: carprice.ru

CarPrice Limited is an online used car broker and auctioneer headquartered in Moscow, Russia, with more than 50 offices in 23 large Russian cities. The company was founded in 2014 by Eduard Gurinovich and Oskar Hartmann. In October 2016 Denis Dolmatov became CEO of the company.

In 2015, CarPrice was mentioned as one of the "hottest European startups" by Wired UK. In February 2016, the company opened an office in Japan.

In the spring of 2026, CarPrice was seized by Russia and transferred to Rostec as part of the trial involving businessman Alexander Galitsky and the investment fund Almaz Capital Partners.

== Investments ==
As of September 2015 CarPrice has closed three investment rounds and received $46 million. According to public information on the company's website and mass media, funding rounds were closed by Russian and European venture funds, such as Baring Vostok Capital Partners, E.ventures, Almaz Capital and others. According to media reports, this deal was the largest investment in the Russian technology start-up since the beginning of economical and financial crisis in 2014. CarPrice was named "Deal of the Year" by Venture Awards Russia 2015.

In June 2017 Mitsui acquired a 25% stake in CarPrice's Japanese office.
