= Hansard (disambiguation) =

Hansard is the traditional name for the printed transcripts of parliamentary debates in the Westminster system of government.

Hansard may also refer to:

== People ==
- Bart Hansard, American actor in Tyler Perry's House of Payne and other shows
- Glen Hansard (1970–2026), Irish singer/guitarist with The Frames
- Luke Hansard (1752–1828), English printer and namesake of the Hansard transcripts
- Thomas Curson Hansard (1776–1833), an English printer and son of Luke Hansard

== Other uses ==
- Hansard (railway point), a railway point in British Columbia, Canada
- Hansard Global, a British financial services firm
- Hansard TV, a legislature broadcaster for British Columbia, Canada
- Hansard (play), a 2019 play by Simon Woods

== See also ==
- Hansard Society, a British society for the promotion of parliamentary democracy
