= Rocketbank =

- Native name: Рокетбанк
- Type: neobank
- Industry: Financial services
- Founded: 2012; 14 years ago in Moscow, Russia
- Founder: Viktor Lysenko; Oleg Kozyrev; Alexey Kolesnikov; Mikhail Provizion
- Headquarters: Moscow, Russia
- Area served: all Russia
- Owner: Sovcombank
- Number of employees: 114 (2025)
- Website: rocketbank.ru

Rocketbank (Russian: Рокетбанк; sometimes «Rocket» Russian: Рокет) is a Russian neobank founded in 2012 by a group of entrepreneurs, such as Viktor Lysenko, Oleg Kozyrev, Alexey Kolesnikov, and Mikhail Provizion. The project originated as a mobile application for transfers and payments, aimed at a youthful demographic, and entered beta testing in March 2013 under the auspices of Intercommerce Bank's license. By 2014, the service had secured investments from the venture capital firm Runa Capital totaling $2 million, facilitating enhancements to its features and broader regional outreach, with transaction volumes surpassing 1 billion rubles.

In 2015, the revocation of Intercommerce Bank's license compelled Rocketbank to pursue a new operational partner. In April 2016, Otkritie FC Bank acquired 100% of the service's shares from its founders and Runa Capital for 300 million rubles, incorporating it into its framework as a digital platform designed to draw in a younger clientele. This transaction exemplified the ongoing consolidation within Russia's fintech landscape, wherein established banks increasingly embraced mobile innovations; at the point of acquisition, Rocketbank boasted roughly 100,000 users.

In August 2017, the QIWI Group purchased the Rocketbank brand, its technologies, and client base—alongside the business-oriented service Tochka—from Otkritie Bank for 700 million rubles amid the latter's sanitization by the Central Bank of Russia. The migration of clients to QIWI Bank's license concluded in July 2018, after which the service grappled with operational hurdles, such as account transfers and alignment with the new ecosystem. Under QIWI's stewardship, Rocketbank persisted as a retail digital bank yet accrued losses attributable to elevated costs for client retention amid intensifying rivalry.

In March 2020, QIWI announced the curtailment of Rocketbank's operations due to the absence of a viable buyer and the misalignment of its business model with the group's strategic objectives, projecting losses up to 1.5 billion rubles for the year. From April 1, the service imposed paid tariffs, discontinued its loyalty program, and halted onboarding of new clients; the transfer of remaining accounts—approximately 43,000 active ones—to other institutions, including Tinkoff Bank, wrapped up by year's end. The definitive closure transpired in January 2021, marking the conclusion of the project's inaugural phase.

In November 2024, Sovcombank acquired the rights to the Rocket (formerly Rocketbank) brand and platform for approximately $1 million, with plans to allocate 1–3 billion rubles toward its relaunch. The revival announcement came in May 2025: the service would recommence operations in July under Sovcombank's license, upholding brand autonomy while emphasizing retail offerings—such as cards, deposits, and loans—for the Moscow and St. Petersburg markets. The refreshed team, incorporating co-founders of Blank Bank Anton Zakharov and Robert Sabiryanov, prioritizes elevating user experience within an evolved competitive terrain.

== Criticism ==
Criticism of Rocketbank primarily centered on its financial instability and business model, which failed to generate sufficient margins. For 2018, the service recorded losses of 1 billion rubles, which QIWI CEO Sergey Solonin attributed to the high cost of customer acquisition and a weak investment component, including the absence of effective tools for the mid-tier depositor segment. In 2019, losses escalated to 2.3 billion rubles, emerging as a pivotal factor in the project's closure, as the neobank model proved unprofitable amid fierce competition from established players such as Tinkoff Bank and Sberbank.

Reputational aspects also drew scrutiny: the project was frequently accused of excessive focus on a "hipster" audience, which constrained its scalability and appealed to a narrow user base weary of rigid banking norms. Following its acquisition by Otkritie Bank in 2016, customers voiced dissatisfaction with service alterations, perceiving them as a loss of independence and "human touch," leading to outflows and negative press coverage of a branding crisis.

Technical disruptions compounded these issues: in August 2017, a cable break in a Moscow data center caused a complete outage of all cards, which bank representatives ascribed to an external incident, though users questioned the infrastructure's reliability. Similarly, in 2018, the introduction of a policy requiring explanations for cash expenditures to unlock accounts sparked accusations of overreach and privacy infringement, highlighting vulnerabilities in the operational framework.

The public feud with Oleg Tinkov, founder of Tinkoff Bank, served as a source of scandals from 2013 onward: Tinkov repeatedly derided Rocketbank as "not a business," offering to buy it for a nominal sum and critiquing its lack of innovation, which analysts viewed as underscoring weaknesses in marketing and positioning, even as it elevated visibility for both brands.

In the context of the 2021 closure, critics including TalkBank founder Mikhail Popov pointed to strategic missteps: the absence of a sustainable business model, reliance on partners like QIWI, and inability to adapt to market shifts, such as rising fees and the elimination of loyalty programs, which resulted in client migrations and eroded loyalty.
