= Rustam Temirgaliev =

Russian politician (born 1956)

Rustam Ilmirovich Temirgaliev Рустам Ильмирович Темиргалиев
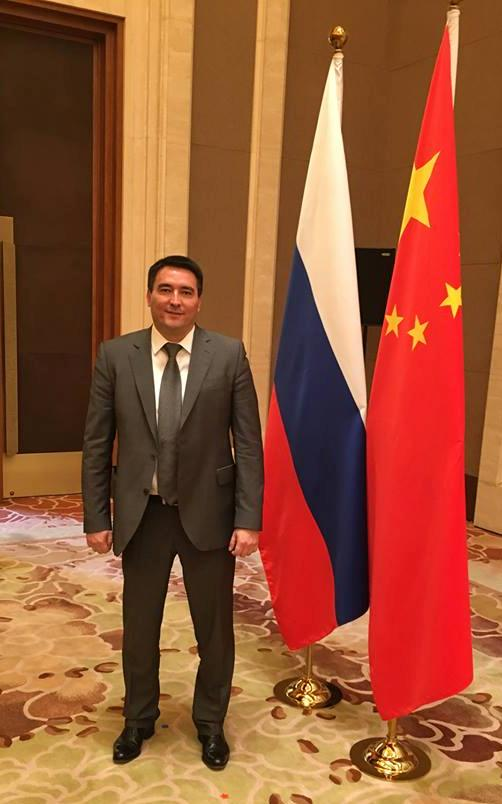
- Temirgaliev in 2017

Deputy Prime Minister of Crimea
- In office 18 September 2013 – 26 February 2014
- Prime Minister: Anatolii Mohyliov
- Preceded by: Valeriy Palchuk
- Succeeded by: Vacant

Director-General Russia-China Investment Fund for Regional Development
- Incumbent
- Assumed office August 8, 2018

Personal details
- Born: 15 August 1976 (age 49) Ulan-Ude, Russian SFSR, Soviet Union
- Party: United Russia
- Other political affiliations: Party of Regions

Rustam Ilmirovich Temirgaliev (Russian: Рустам Ильмирович Темиргалиев, Ukrainian: Рустам Ільмирович Темиргалієв, Tatar: Рөстәм Ильмир улы Темиргалиев, romanized: Röstäm İlmir ulı Temirgaliyew) is the Director General Russia-China Investment Fund for Regional Development since August 8, 2018. He previously held the position of Deputy Chairman of the Council of Ministers of the Autonomous Republic of Crimea.

== Biography ==
He was born on August 15, 1976, in Ulan-Ude, Russian SFSR. His father Ilmir Nasikhovich Temirgaliev moved to Crimea in 1983, after finishing his military service in the Group of Soviet Forces in Germany. In Crimea, Rustam Temirgaliev finished high school in the village of Perevalne. In 1998 Temirgaliev graduated from the Kyiv National Economic University. After studying he worked as a teacher of economic policy in the Crimean Institute of Economy and Administrative Law. In 2002-03 Temirgaliev worked for the State Innovation Company. In 2003-05 he was a member of the Crimean republican government and in 2003-04 he was a deputy chairman of the Committee on Affairs of Family and Youth.

In 2005-09 Temirgaliev continued his education in the National Academy of State Administration. In 2010 he was elected to the Supreme Council of Crimea on a party list of the Party of Regions.

Temirgaliev is a Volga Tatar and his father Ilmir Nasihovich has been the chairman of the Association of Volga Tatars in the Republic of Crimea and Ukraine. According to Mustafa Dzhemilev, Rustam Temirgaliev is an agent of the Russian GRU.

During the 2014 Crimea crisis he sided with Sergey Aksyonov and played a key role in the Russian annexation of Crimea.

=== Sanctions ===
In 2014, Temirgaliev was sanctioned by the UK and US for involvement in the Russo-Ukrainian War.

== Criminal proceedings ==
=== In Ukraine ===
On April 2, 2014, Rustam Temirgaliev was placed on the SBU wanted list for "actions aimed at violent change or overthrow the constitutional order or the seizure of state power" (Article 109, part 1, Criminal Code of Ukraine).

=== In Russia ===
In February 2015 the media reported about investigation against Temirgaliyev. But Temirgaliyev stated that he was only a witness and was not related to this story.
