= Sherzod Yusupov =

Uzbek-born businessman and banker

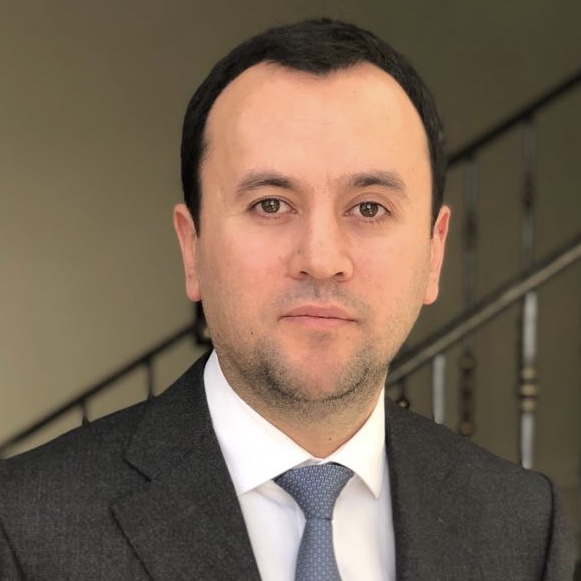
- Born: 1981 (age 43–44); Urgench, Uzbek SSR, USSR
- Occupation(s): Banker, Businessman
- Board member of: Vostochny Bank, Modulbank

Sherzod Iskanderovich Yusupov (Russian: Шерзод Искандарович Юсупов; born 1981, in Urgench, Uzbek SSR) is an Uzbek-born businessman and banker.

== Education ==
Sherzod Yusupov earned his diploma in Business and Finance from the Calderdale College in the UK. He also holds an MBA from the EAE Business School in Barcelona, Spain.

== Career ==
Yusupov was a shareholder and member of the board of directors of Russian Vostochny Bank and Modulbank.

The Charitable Fund Sakhovat was founded by Sherzod Yusupov and Sabir Shodiev, son of billionaire Uzbek businessman Patokh Chodiev, with the aim of supporting Uzbek migrants in Russia.
