= Rheinisches Landesmuseum Bonn =

Museum in Germany

Coordinates: 50°43′55.2″N 7°5′33.43″E

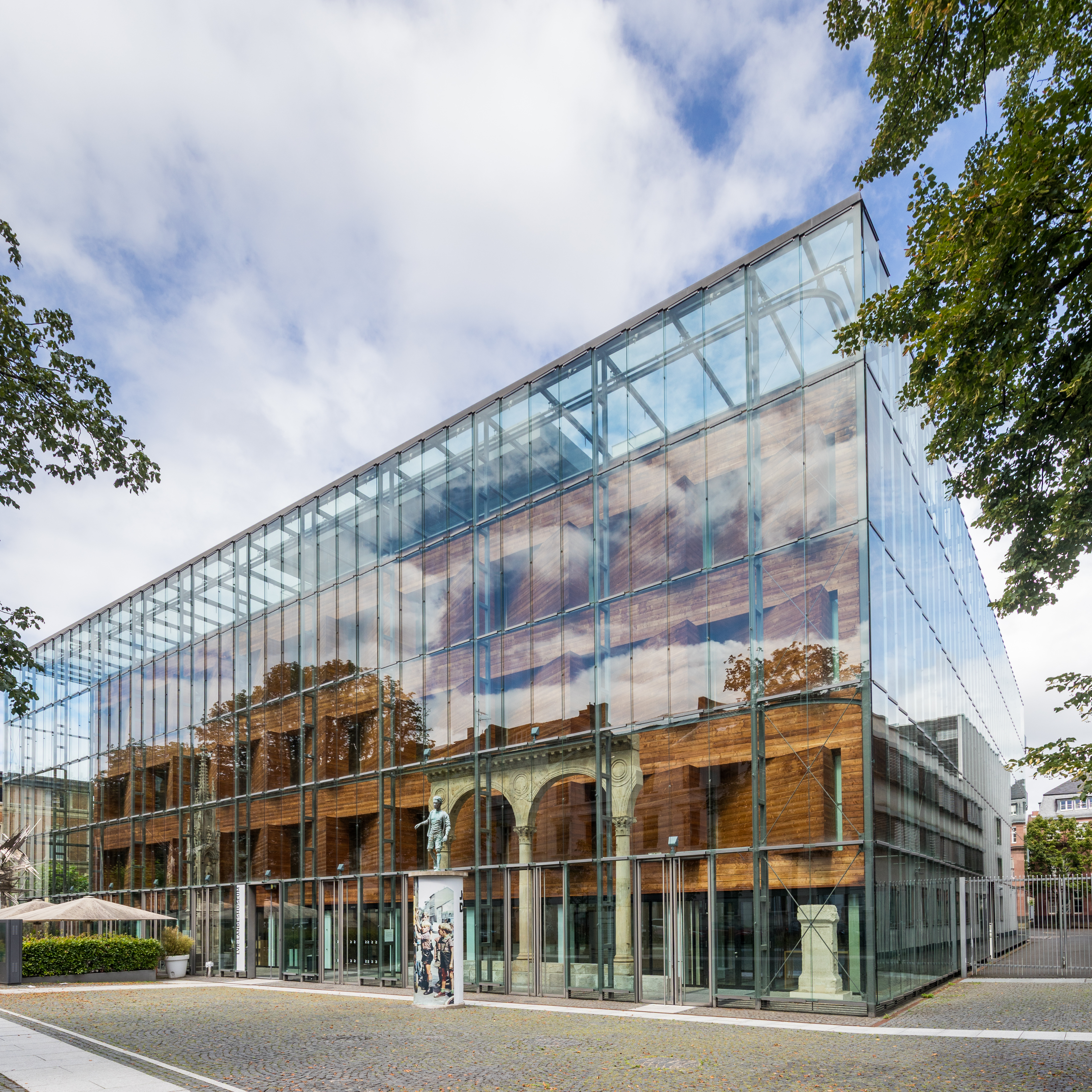
Rheinisches Landesmuseum Bonn.

Rheinisches Landesmuseum Bonn

The Rheinisches Landesmuseum Bonn, or LVR-LandesMuseum Bonn, is a museum in Bonn, Germany, run by the Rhineland Landscape Association. It is one of the oldest museums in the country. In 2003 it completed an extensive renovation. The museum has a number of notable ancient busts and figures dating back to Roman times.

== History ==
An early forerunner, the "Museum of Antiquities" (Museum Rheinisch-Westfälischer Alterthümer), was founded in 1820 by decree of the Prussian state chancellor Karl August von Hardenberg. A more direct ancestor, the "Provincial Museum", was founded in 1874, though it did not get its own building until 1893. This was enlarged in 1907, but the older section was destroyed during World War II and replaced by a new building.

The museum was extensively renovated from 1998 to 2003, allowing a new presentation of the exhibits. The "Stone Age Area" was redesigned in 2010.

== Permanent exhibitions ==
The archaeological exhibits are divided into historical themes, e.g. "From the Gods to God", "The Rhineland and the World", or "From Primeval Landscapes to Cities". Works of art are also displayed (non-chronologically) throughout the exhibition, with masterpieces next to simple tools and religious works beside everyday objects. The museum also owns a collection of prints and photographs, and one of coins and medallions. The "Stone Age Area" features the original skeleton of the type specimen Neanderthal 1, and displays the evolution of humanity from the development of upright posture to the early Celtic cultures of Europe.

== Gallery ==
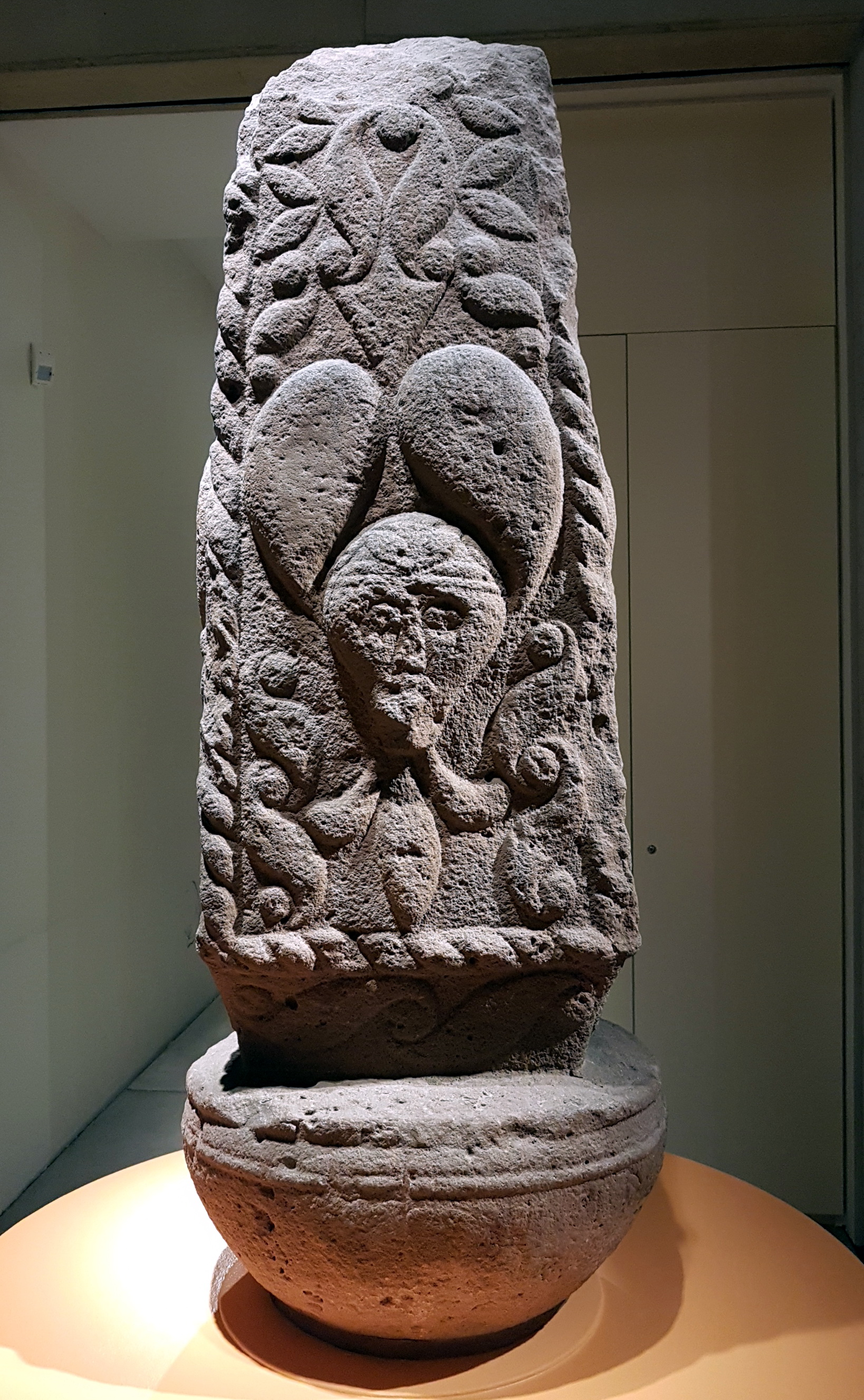
Pfalzfeld obelisk, c. 400 BC

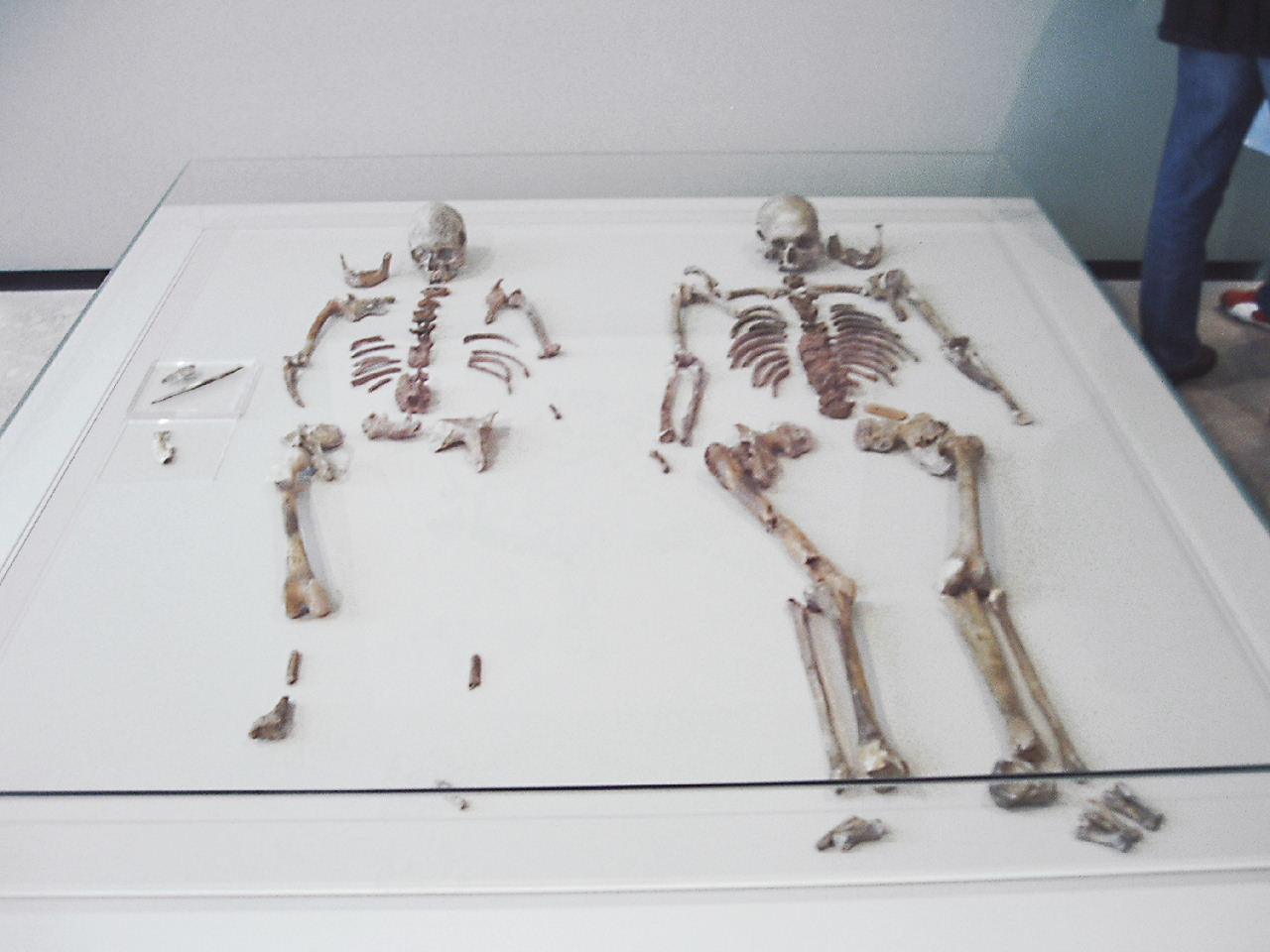
Skeletons from Oberkassel, c.11,000 BC

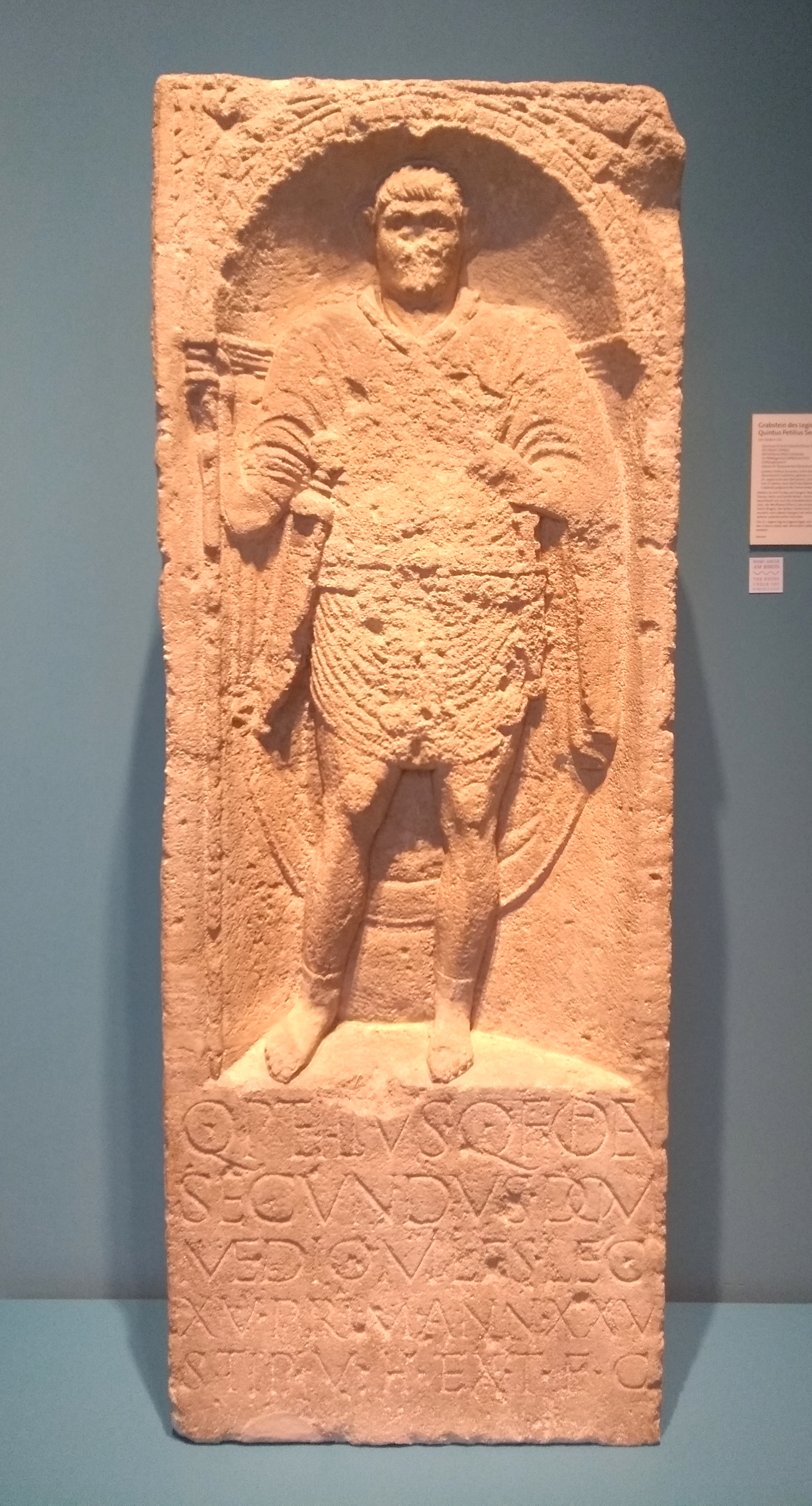
Gravestone of Quintus Petilius Secundus (died c.65 AD)

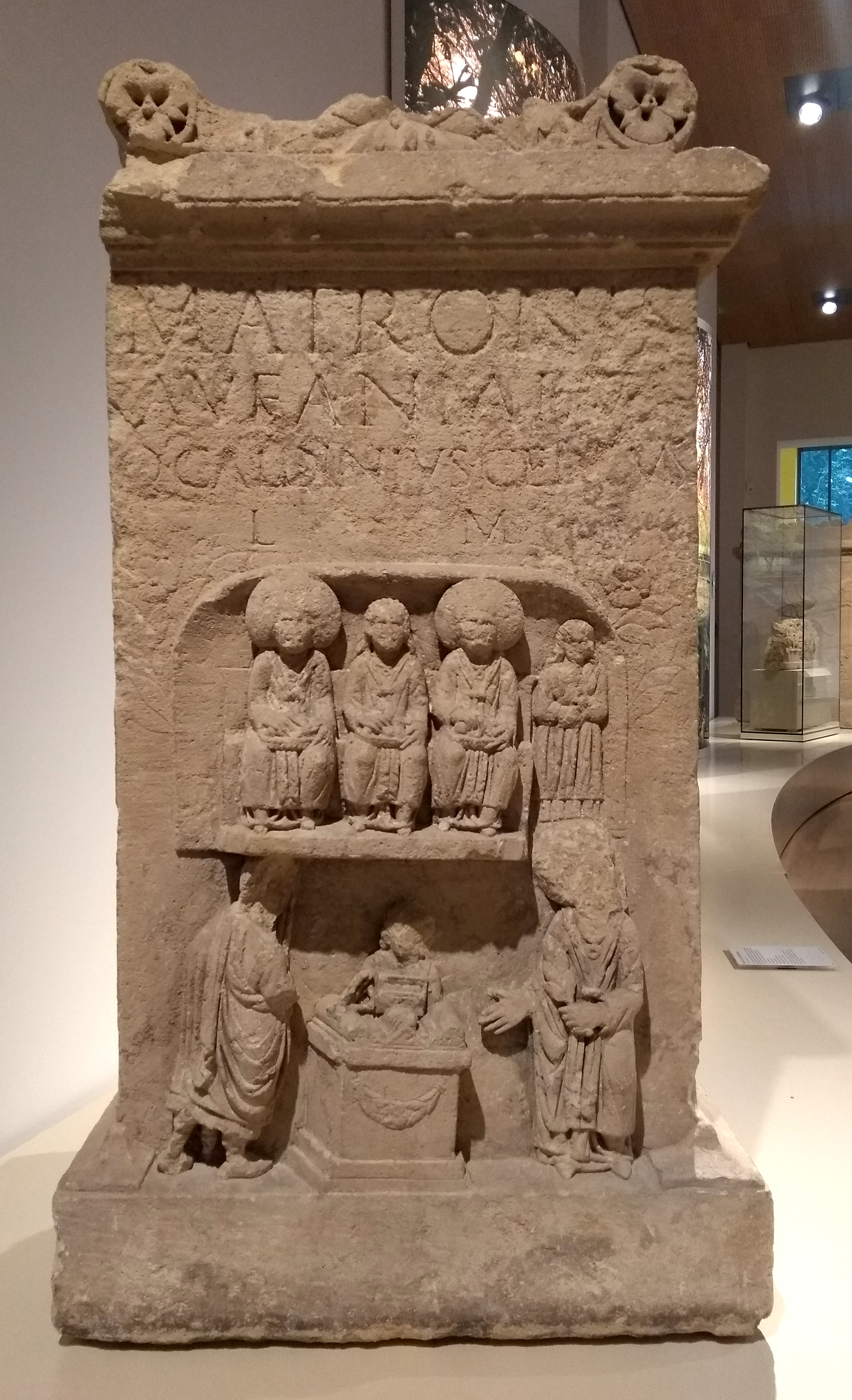
Matronal altar

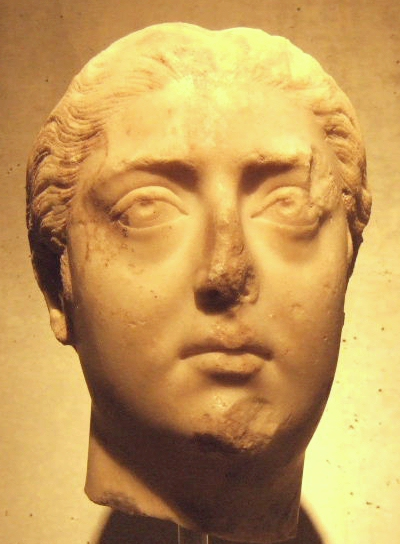
Bonn Roman woman, c. 180-200 AD

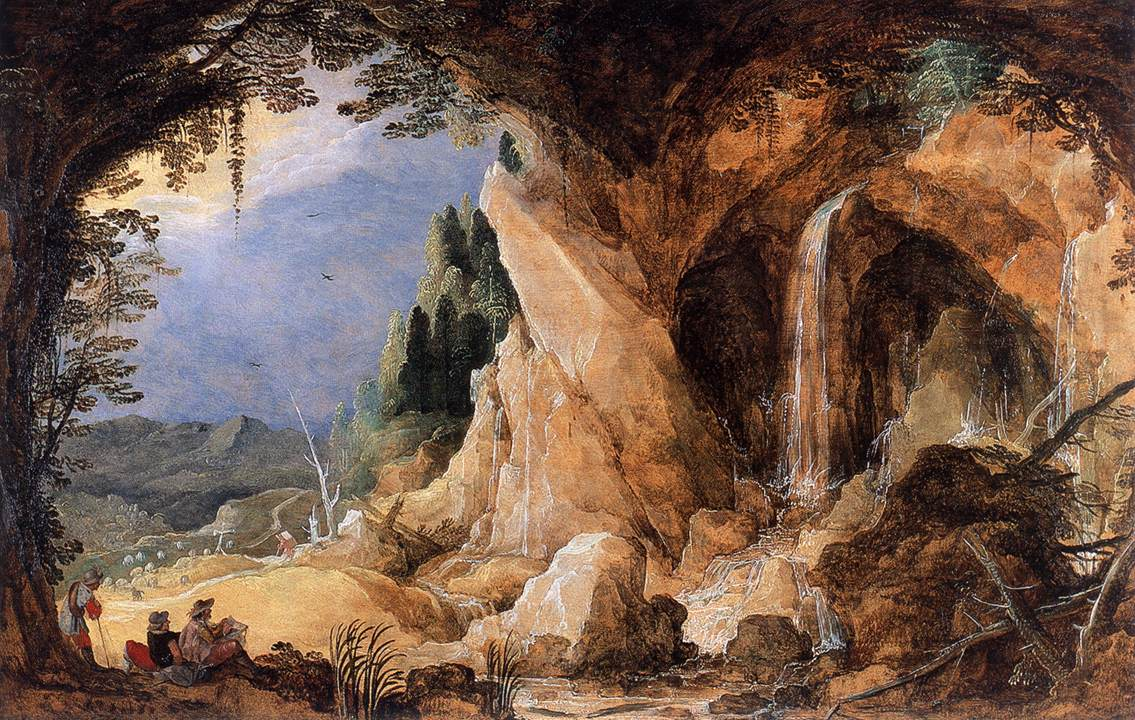
Landscape with Grotto, Joos de Momper c. 1616

The Banks of the Rhine in Cologne by Clarkson Stanfield, 1826

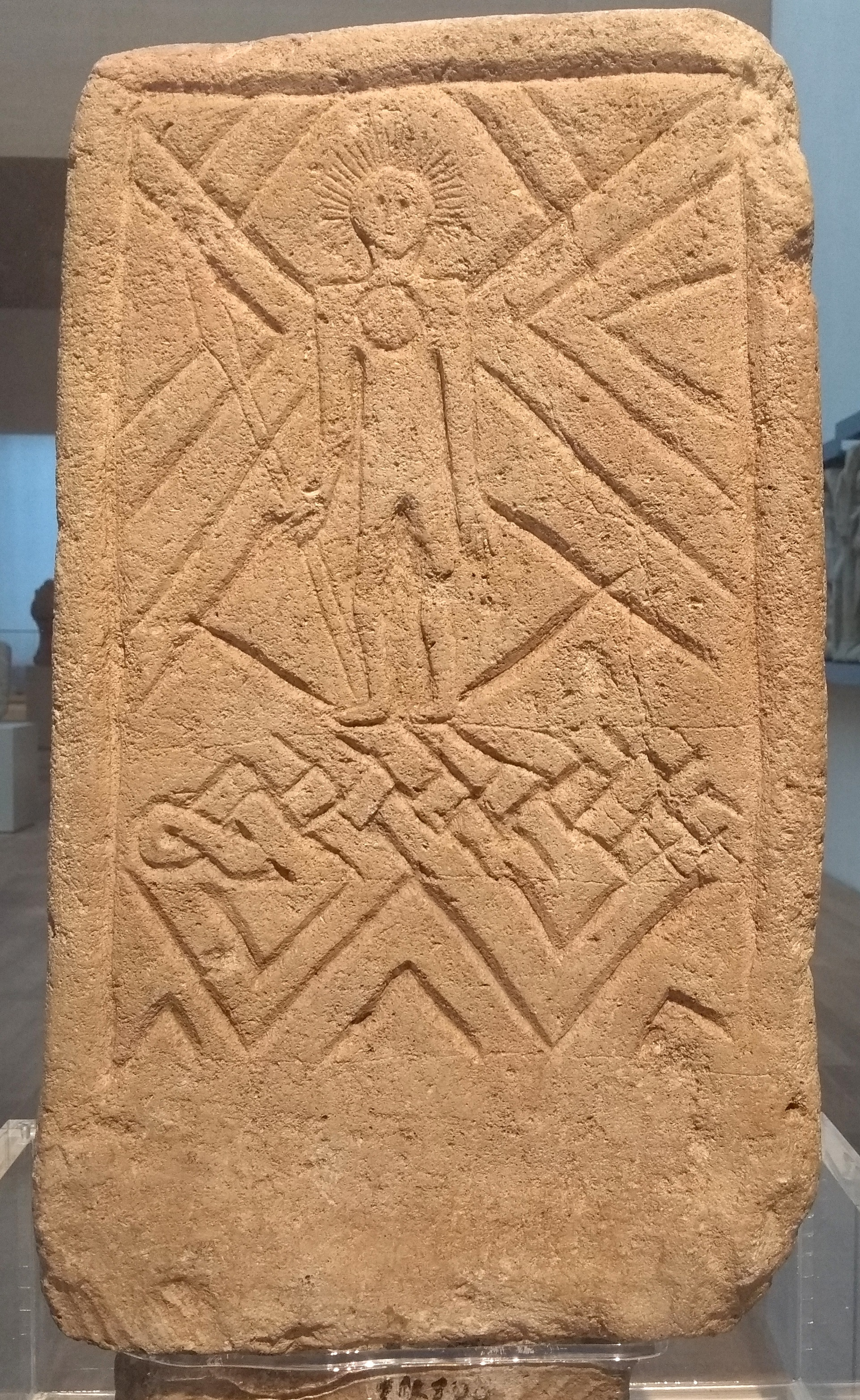
7th-century AD Niederdollendorf gravestone

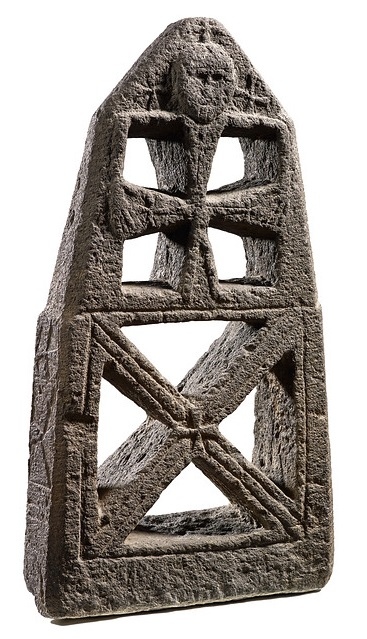
7th-century Moselkern stele

== Other features ==
The Jugend im Museum society offers "holidays in the museum" for children, and there are also themed workshops at weekends. The museum has a cinema which mostly shows subtitled foreign films, sometimes for school classes.

== Artists ==
Some artists whose works are represented in Rheinisches Landesmuseum Bonn include:

- Bernd Schwarzer
- Rita Rohlfing
