= Verticali =

Russian telecommunications company

Vertical
- Company type: Private
- Founded: 2013; 13 years ago
- Founder: George Chumburidze
- Successor: Moscow
- Headquarters: Rochdelskaya, Moscow, Russia
- Area served: Russia
- Revenue: ▲ ₽ 32.8 million (2016)
- Website: http://verticali.ru/

Vertical (Russian: Вертикаль) is a Russian company that engaged in the construction and further leasing of towers to mobile operators such as MTS, MegaFon, VimpelCom and Tele2 Russia. According to the research done by Advanced Communications & Media (AC&M), in the first half of 2019, Vertical was the second largest independent telecom infrastructure company in Russia, owning 3500 towers.

== Industry ==
The company was established in 2013, when mobile operators began to actively develop the LTE standard in Moscow region. Large, complex and expensive towers of up to 100 meters high were presented at that time in the market. Vertical specialised in simple and cheap dual-purpose supports, which, in addition to base stations, were equipped with lighting and other equipment.

The company began servicing MTS, Megafon, VimpelCom, and Tele2, and by 2015 leased them about 1,000 towers . In 2015 and 2016, the company participated in the competition for the purchase of VimpelCom towers .

As of July 1, 2017 the company owned more than 2,500 cells sites in Moscow and Moscow region, making it the second largest independent infrastructure company in Russia. In the first half of 2019, the company owned approximately 3,500 thousand towers.

== Owners and management ==
The business weekly "Kompania" called Vertical "the most closed participant in the market of antenna mast structures". According to the database Contour.Focus, the founders of the company were Innova entertainment with a share of 99% and CEO Vladimir Manokhin with 1%. In 2015 the main owner of the Innova entertainment Georgy Chumburidze announced reporters that he fully controlled "Vertical" and made operational decisions.

In June 2017 the company has been funded by the Baring Vostok Capital Partners investment fund, which provided the company with funds for the development of 4G and 5G network infrastructure and the acquisition of additional assets. The transaction amount and the acquired share were not disclosed; in 2017, a Vertical representative called an investment fund the main shareholder.

== Finance ==
The company does not disclose financial indicators. According to SPARK-Interfax, the revenue of Vertical in 2014 amounted to 88.2 million rubles with a net loss of 88.3 million. Sources of the RBC News, company's estimated revenue in 2015 at 300 million rubles. According to SPARK-Interfax, in 2016, the company received 32.8 million rubles of net profit, with 844.8 million rubles of revenue.

In March 2017 the company took a one-time loan of 1.8 billion rubles from Rosbank. Previously, Sberbank of Russia was the main lender to Vertical, provided a loan of 2 billion rubles.
