= Landscape with Grotto =

Painting by Joos de Momper

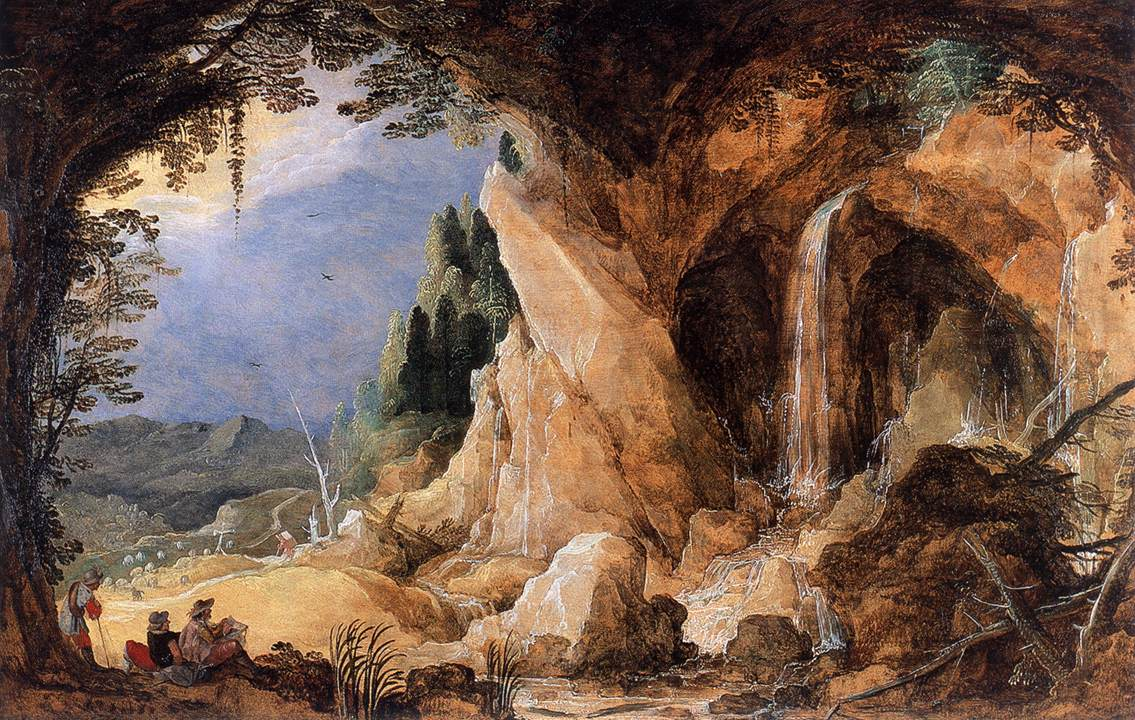
- Artist: Joos de Momper
- Year: Late 16th century or early 17th century
- Catalogue: 38.20
- Medium: Oil on panel
- Dimensions: 61.2 cm × 93 cm (24 in × 36.6 in)
- Location: Rheinisches Landesmuseum, Bonn

Landscape with Grotto is an oil-on-panel painting by Flemish painter Joos de Momper. The painting was completed in the 1610s, possibly in 1616, and is now in the Rheinisches Landesmuseum in Bonn.

== Painting ==
Joos de Momper was part of a group of Flemish landscapists whose paintings often depicted foreign and craggy topography. His landscapes often included a grotto, such is the case with the present work.

At the bottom left, a shepherd leans on his staff as his flock of sheep grazes on the meadow below. He stands overlooking two seated men, one of whom is an artist sketching the rocks and the waterfall in front of them.
