= Quintus Petilius Secundus =

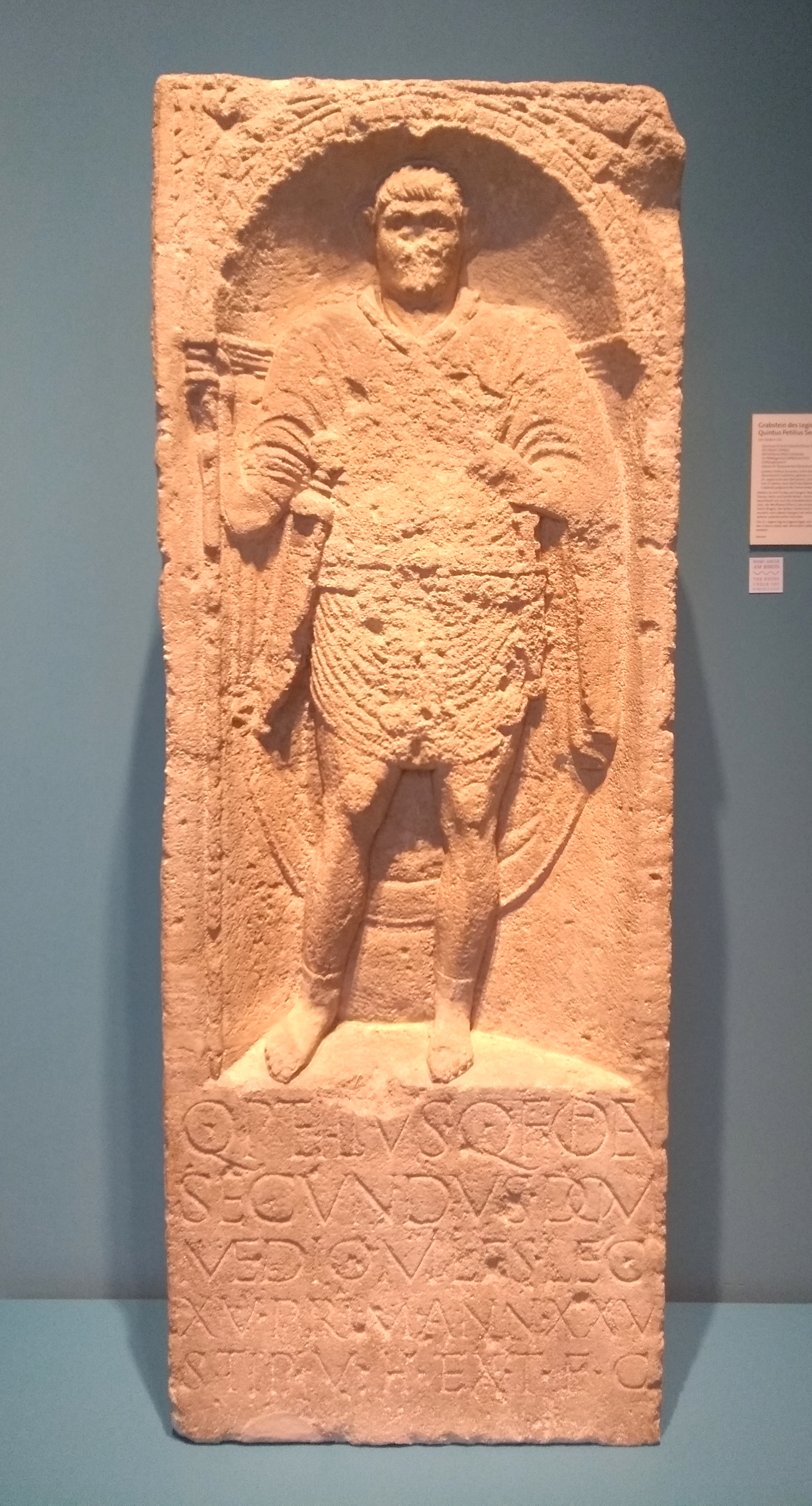
Quintus Petilius Secundus

Quintus Petilius Secundus was a Roman legionary in the 15th legion. He was born around 30 AD, probably in Milan and died 25 years later in Bonn.

Quintus Petilius Secundus, son of Quintus Petilius came from Milan and was part of the voting district (Tribus) Oufentina. Petilius was a soldier of the Legio XV Primigenia and was noted for his early construction work in the Bonn area of modern-day Germany. His tombstone was found in 1755 in the Electoral Palace. It is now housed in the Rheinisches Landesmuseum Bonn.
