= Alexander Galitsky =

Russian technology entrepreneur

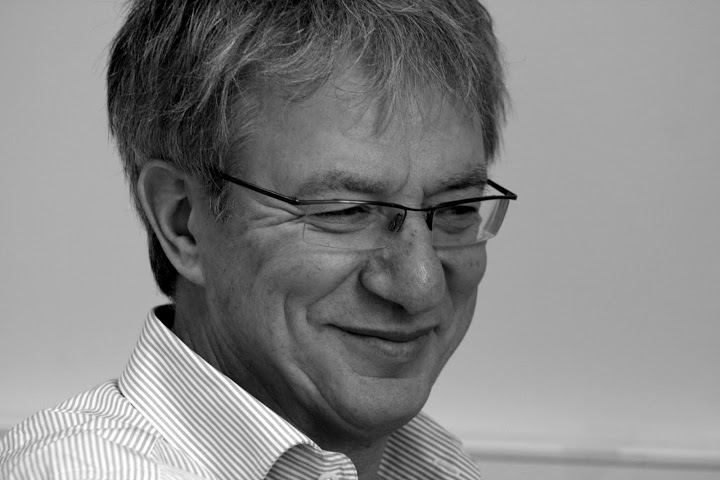
- Alexander Galitsky, 2015 year
- Born: Alexander Vladimirovich Galitsky; 9 February 1955 (age 71); Zarichany, Zhytomyr Oblast, UkrSSR, Soviet Union
- Citizenship: Dutch, Russian
- Education: Moscow Institute of Electronic Technology
- Occupations: Investor and entrepreneur
- Known for: founder and managing partner of Almaz Capital founder of ELVIS-PLUS pioneer of Wi-Fi and VPN technologies

Alexander Galitsky (Ukrainian: Олекса́ндр Володи́мирович Га́лицький; born February 9, 1955, in Zarichany, Zhytomyr Oblast, UkrSSR, Soviet Union) is an international technology entrepreneur. He is the founder of ELVIS-PLUS and the founder and managing partner of Almaz Capital, and involved in many technology companies in Europe and the USA. In the Soviet years, he was a defense scientist in the Soviet space industry. Galitsky identities himself a Ukrainian.

== Biography ==
=== Early years ===
Alexander Galitsky was born on February 9, 1955, in the village of Zarichany, Zhytomyr Region, Ukrainian SSR. He graduated from school with honors and entered the Moscow Institute of Electronic Technology (MIET). Galitsky became interested in theoretical physics and computer calculations. He did his practical work at the Zelenograd Scientific Research Institute of Microdevices (NIIMP) and continued to work there, obtaining a diploma in 1979. Subsequently, at Moscow Institute of Physics and Technology at the Research Institute of Micro-Instruments, he defended his PhD dissertation in technical sciences in the specialty of Technical Cybernetics.

=== NPO "ELAS" and STC "ELVIS" ===
Scientific Research Institute of Microdevices was the head enterprise of the ELAS research and production association (NPO) and the leading Soviet scientific center for space technology. The Institute developed satellites for remote sensing of the surface of the Earth, computer systems for the Mir orbital station, and space communications systems.

In the years of Perestroika, the scientific institutes were reorganized, and the scientific and technical center "ELVIS" (electronic computer information systems) with about 400 employees was under the leadership of Galitsky.

In 1990 the founder of Sun Microsystems Bill Joy and the director of the science office John Gage came to the USSR at the invitation of the USSR International Computer Club, looking for talented technical specialists . Galitsky showed Sun executives a flexible 22-layer polyamide PCB, which he had developed in ELAS and which was significantly superior to the 8-layer boards being produced in large quantities. The IP-based data transmission system for spy satellites also made a strong impression.

In 1991, Galitsky first visited Silicon Valley and returned from a trip with the idea of promoting Soviet technological developments in the West through the creation of Soviet companies in the US and attracting venture capital from local investors.

== Entrepreneurship ==
=== ELVIS+ ===
Sun Microsystems agreed with the US State Department to provide Galitsky, his colleagues and other leading specialists from Zelenograd and their family members with 200 green cards for moving to the States. Sun sent Galitsky 20 high-performance workstations with SPARC processors. ELVIS was not allowed to register such equipment by law, and in order to get round this legal conflict, Galitsky and his colleagues established private ELVIS+ in November 1991.

The collaboration of ELVIS+ with Sun began with a project of a low-orbit satellite communications system, which was curtailed due to a lack of funding and restrictions on the export of technologies. The companies continued to work for the implementation of the 802.11 protocol (which was later named Wi-Fi) in a PCMCIA-compatible device for integrating mobile computers into a wireless network. In 1993 ELVIS+ was already ahead of other contractors attracted by Sun, including Motorola, and presented its development in 1993. Sun then bought 10% of the company for $1 million. In the wake of rumors about Galitsky's involvement in the creation of nuclear weapons delivery systems for the countries of the Middle East, closed hearings were held with the participation of representatives of US intelligence agencies and senators.

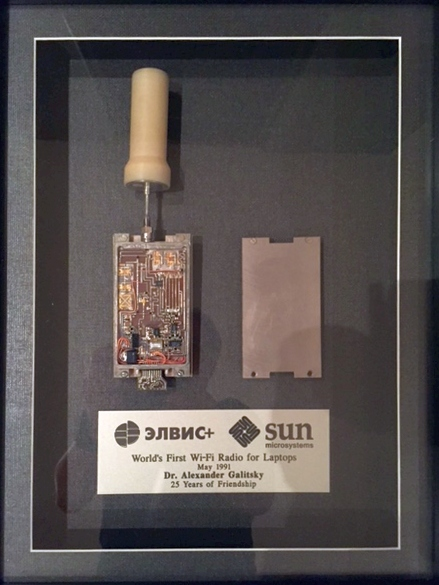
The world's first Wi-Fi module for laptops, developed by ELVIS+

The wireless transmitter developed by ELVIS+ turned out to be of little demand in the market of the early 1990s. Ultimately, ELVIS+ sold its wireless technology to the US government.

Together with the 1993 investment agreement, ELVIS+ and Sun signed a multi-year cooperation agreement, under which the Galitsky company engaged in a variety of contract development for American partners. In 1996 ELVIS+ used a cracked Microsoft network driver to develop a first ever VPN for computers running Windows operating systems. In 1997 the Sun Microsystems purchased from ELVIS+ an OEM license for worldwide distribution for Windows 3.11 and Windows 95 platforms. The product received certification of the state technical commission under the President of the Russian Federation. The US authorities did not believe that the Russian company could develop such a complex technology on its own, and initiated an investigation, which was conducted by the National Security Agency.

The Wall Street Journal included the company among 10 businesses from Central and Eastern Europe, which succeeded in the global markets and competed with their largest players.

=== Elvis Telecom ===
In 1992 ELVIS+ launched the first fax gateway (FoIP) in Russia and began to provide Internet fax services. In 1993 it became one of the first Internet providers in Russia, In 1996 it organized the formation of the Internet provider Elvis Telecom. By 2000 the company was serving about 10,000 customers in Moscow and made up 15% of Internet telephony market in Moscow. In October 2000, Norwegian national telecommunications operator Telenor acquired a controlling stake in Elvis Telecom.

=== TrustWorks ===
TrustWorks was established by Galitsky in March 1998 in the Netherlands. TrustWorks has been developing and selling information security and VPN management solutions based on the IPsec family of protocols developed at ELVIS+. In January 2000 at the World Economic Forum in Davos TrustWorks and Galitsky were awarded the Technology Innovation for New Millennium Award in the first Pioneers of Technology session on innovative technologies of the 21st century. In 2002, the firm was sold to the British Hansard Global and was renamed to Synatra.

=== EzWim ===
Galitsky founded EzWim in Amsterdam in 2001, which provided corporate clients with SaaS solutions for managing telephone expenses of their employees. In October 2010 EzWim was acquired by the TMT Ventures consortium.

== Investments ==
In 2003 Sven Lingjærde, a partner at Vision Capital venture fund and the Tech Tour founder, offered Galitsky to become the president of the first Tech Tour in Russia next year — a specialized forum in which international investors visited countries with growing venture markets and got to know local startups. Out of more than 200 technology companies working in different fields, his team selected 25 of them to meet the investors,. Among the companies chosen to meet the investors were Abbyy, Acronis, Intelligent Security Systems, Mera Systems, ParallelGraphics, Parallels, Yandex and others. Later, in 2018, he became president of the Eastern European Tech Tour, which took place in Poland and Bulgaria. In 2019 he led the Eastern European Tech Tour in Romania and Bulgaria.

From 2003 to 2007, Galitsky was an advisor and private investor in a number of companies. He invested in Start Telecom telecommunications company (purchased by Synterra), NavMaps — a manufacturer of navigation maps for cars (acquired by Tele Atlas), Evernote, Parallels and Acronis, SJLabs (acquired by YMAX), PGP Corporation, developers of network security solutions C-Terra and Magnifire (sold to F5 Networks).

In 2005–2007, Galitsky accepted an invitation from Russian Technologies, the first Russian investment fund, and participated as their consultant in establishing the fund's IT investment practice

=== Almaz Capital ===
In 2004, representatives of Cisco offered Galitsky to create a venture fund for them to invest in Russian startups. Galitsky accepted the offer, and in 2008 Almaz Capital international venture fund with headquarter in Silicon Valley, was established. Cisco was later joined by the European Bank for Reconstruction and Development and the fund totaled $72 million US dollars.

In 2013, Galitsky established a second fund – Almaz Capital II, with a capital of $174 mln. The list of the Fund's main investors (Cisco Systems and EBRD) was enriched by International Finance Corporation included in a group of the World Bank.

Almaz Fund's III with a capital of $191 mln final close was in 2021. EBRD still remained the main investor enriched by European Investment Fund (EIF). The geographical focus mostly moved to the Eastern European countries, although CIS is still in the scope of interest of the Fund.

== Public activities ==
In 2006 Galitsky became the head of the advisory board for the development of venture capital investment, established by the Ministry of Digital Development, Communications and Mass Media of the Russian Federation. In 2010 he was invited to the Board of the Skolkovo Foundation along with Eric Schmidt (Google), John Chambers (Cisco), Craig Barret (Intel) and other international high-tech experts and participated in the development of the project on a voluntary basis. Galitsky was often credited with the successful launch of Skolkovo before its infrastructure was built. Also in 2010, he joined the advisory board of the Russian Venture Company and became its coordinator. Later Galitsky was invited to the board of trustees of the Russian Quantum Center along with Paul Maritz (ex-CEO of VMWare and Pivotal), scientists from Harvard and the Massachusetts Institute of Technology, as well as European scientific organizations. In 2012 Galitsky was invited to the expert council for the development of the information technology industry under the Ministry of Digital Development, Communications and Mass Media of the Russian Federation.

For many years Galitsky has also been a member of the supervisory board of the business incubator of Moscow State University and the board of trustees of SkolTech. Galitsky was the chairman of the RVC Venture Market Public Advisory Council. Also Galitsky was on the board of directors of the Ukrainian Association of Venture Capital and Direct Investments (UVCA) since 2016.

As of May 2022, Galitsky is no longer on the list of members of the Board of Trustees / Directors / Advisory of the Russian Quantum Center, RVC, Alfa Bank, SkolTech, Skolkovo Venture Investments, MSU Business Incubator, Megafon, UVCA, the Expert Council for the Development of the Information Technology Industry, the Venture Market Council and the Skolkovo Foundation Board.

Galitsky has been and remains a strategic advisor of B612 Foundation since 2012.

== Acknowledgement ==
In 2011 the Russian Forbes named Galitsky the most influential person in the Russian IT market and included him in the rating of the most remarkable Russians who achieved success abroad. Also in 2011 Forbes included Galitsky in the list of 30 people defining the face of the Russian IT business, noting his contribution to the development of Wi-Fi and VPN technologies.

In 2000 at the World Economic Forum in Davos he was named "Pioneer in the field of technology".

In 2013 he was awarded the first Russian award in the field of venture capital financing Venture Awards Russia 2013, organized by Rusbase and Firrma publications with the support of RVC, Venture Kitchen project and PricewaterhouseCoopers audit and consulting group. In November 2013 Galitsky became the winner of the Russian stage of the annual contest "Entrepreneur of the Year", a global program that recognizes entrepreneurial achievement among individuals and companies, organized by EY consulting company. Later he was a member of its jury.

== Other ==
Galitsky is the author of more than 100 publications and owns 30 patents on developments in the areas of parallel computing, wireless networks and VPN technologies. One of the American patents — on a radio transmitter — was registered together with Geoffrey Baehr, who later became his partner in Almaz Capital.

== Extremism сharges ==
According to the RBC, on March 11, 2026, the Tverskoy District Court of Moscow received an administrative lawsuit from the Prosecutor General's Office of the Russian Federation, demanding a ban on the activities of Alexander Galitsky and his investment holding company Almaz Capital on Russian territory, designating them as part of an extremist organization. The Prosecutor General's Office also demanded the confiscation of the entrepreneur's assets: real estate worth over 1 billion rubles and more than 7 billion rubles from bank accounts.

According to the information obtained by the RBC, the prosecutor's office concluded that the venture capital fund had supported US and EU sanctions, ceased investing in Russian companies, began moving capital abroad, and had started providing military assistance to Ukraine by channeling more than $50 million to Ukrainian companies developing and manufacturing ammunition, drone components, and other types of weaponry.
