= Vasily Klyukin =

Russian sculptor and architect

Vasily Klyukin (born March 3, 1976) is a Russian-born, Monaco-based visual artist, sculptor and architect.

== Biography ==
=== Early life ===
Vasily was born into a family of teachers, as his father Vasily Klyukin Senior was a writer, historian, and doctor of historical sciences, while his mother Elena Klyukin is an editor and schoolteacher. He grew up with art at home and with his parents taking him to museums. Growing up, he greatly admired artist Auguste Rodin, whose works he saw in the Pushkin Museum in Moscow. Klyukin never had time for his own art, as he searched for meaningful employment in his early 20s, alongside his younger brother. He received a degree in economics and became an Israeli citizen in 2004. From 2009 to 2011, he was involved in real estate development, especially reconstructing buildings and changing the purpose of properties. In 2011, he completely abandoned entrepreneurial activity, got rid of his assets and decided to devote his life to art.

=== Architecture ===
In 2011, Klyukin moved to Monaco and devoted his life to art and architecture. Influenced by architects with global firms like Thornton Tomasetti, Klyukin began to focus on highly imaginative digital architectural design. In 2014, he created a digital design project called “Designing Legends,” a book of imaginary architecture that was published by Skira Editore in Milan. The designs from the book, where he riffed on using world-renowned artists like Piet Mondrian for the basis of skyscrapers, went viral on art publications like ArchDaily and Designboom.

=== Sculpture ===
In 2019, Klyukin's work was introduced to the global art world with his sculptures. He has a trademark technique where he makes multi-faceted sculptures that are connected in a way without the use of fasteners. He connects industrial materials like laser-cut steel, polycarbonate, plywood, or cardboard into 3D sculptures, which the artist finishes by hand painting. He does this for his sculpture series “In Dante Veritas” which was inspired by Dante's Divine Comedy. The solo exhibition with over 20 sculptures started its world tour in the courtyard of the Mikhailovsky Castle of the State Russian Museum in 2018, then traveled to the Venice Biennale in 2019, in the Arsenale Nord. In 2020, it showed in Lucerne, Switzerland near Château Gütsch. In 2021, to commemorate the 700th anniversary of Dante's death, his artwork “Mask of Dante" was on view in two Swiss cities, Zug and Lucerne. Four others from the series have been permanently installed at the Central Park of Bad Breisig in Germany.

In 2017 Klyukin designed the Golden Madonnina statuette for the Milan Design Week, and in 2020, he showed his wall sculptures from his “Crypto” series in a solo exhibition at the Simon Lee Gallery in London.

In 2021, Klyukin held a major exhibition called "Civilization: The Island of the Day Before" at the Kunstforum Wien in Vienna, where his 4.5-meter-high brass sculpture entitled "413" was don display outside the museum's entrance. It was later installed in Malaga, Spain, with the support of the city authorities and local foundations.

From September 2022 to January 2023 Klyukin's solo exhibition "Mind Space" was on view at the first-ever museum of contemporary art, the Osthaus Museum Hagen, Germany. The artist created sculptures primarily for the museum spaces and presented to the viewers about 300 sculptures up to 7.5 meters high (“K-Objects”), including 144 60 cm wall pieces from the series “Embryo composition”. Also on display were sculptures created in collaboration with the well-known German artist Bernd Schwarzer and Pierre Bonnefille from France.

German art critic Dieter Ronte wrote about the artist, calling him a “cautionary futurist.” Ronte wrote: “He is an optimist through art, who offers the artistic outcry for our broken world, so that new reflective action can arise. He understands the power of art to bring environmental awareness. The artist becomes a prophet.”

=== Charity ===
Klyukin has long been involved in philanthropy, supporting a large number of organizations, and his sculptures are sold at charity auctions, such as UNICEF, WWF, Naked Heart, amfAR, Leonardo DiCaprio Foundation, Prince Albert II Foundation, Andrea Bocelli Foundation.

== Collections ==
Klyukin's works can be found in the collections of museums such as The State Russian Museum in St. Petersburg, Russia, the Osthaus Museum Hagen in Hagen, Germany, Das Seewerk Museum in Moers, Germany, and the Museum Tower of David in Jerusalem, Israel.

Since 2023, the artist is exclusively presented in the United States by the Serge Sorokko Gallery, San Francisco.

The year 2023 marks the sculptor's collaboration with fashion brand Mônot by the designer Eli Mizrahi for Paris Fashion Week.

== Publications ==
Art history books about Klyukin's work are published by such global publishers as Skira Editore (Milan); Palace Editions (The State Russian Museum, Saint Petersburg); and the Verlag für moderne Kunst (Vienna).

- Designing Legends (2014). Milan: Skira Editore. 288 p. ISBN 978-88-572-2038-3.

The visionary projects by Vasily Klyukin.

- Klyukin, Vasily (2016). Collective Mind. Published by Vasily Klyukin. 360 p. ISBN 978-09-973-5172-9.

A dystopian sci-fi novel in which a society, powered by an AI, is challenged by a man who rebels against a system that trades individual creativity for technological control.

- Live Sculptures (2019). Milan: Skira Editore. 224 p. ISBN 978-88-572-4004-6.

This book presents extraordinary three-dimensional “live sculptures” by Vasily Klyukin.

- In Dante Veritas. Sins Artguide (2021). E-book.

The online multimedia book is an imaginary journey through the inferno, accompanied by the greatest artists in history.

- In Dante Veritas (2021). St. Petersburg: Palace Editions. 198 p. ISBN 978-3-906917-08-5.

A book based on Klyukin's exhibition of the same name at Arsenale Nord on view during the Venice Biennale 2019, published in 2021 to commemorate the 700th anniversary of the great poet Dante Alighieri's death.

- Civilization. The Island of the Day Before (2021). Vienna: VfmK Verlag für moderne Kunst GmbH. 200 p. ISBN 978-3-903572-22-5.

Сatalog of Vasily's solo exhibition of the same name at the Bank Austria Kunstforum Vienna 05-30 August 2021.

- Vasily Klyukin: Mind Space (2022). Hagen: Neuer Folkwang Verlag im Osthaus Museum Hagen. 256 p. ISBN 978-3-926242-99-0.

The catalog commemorates Klyukin's exhibition of the same name at the Osthaus Museum Hagen, the first-ever museum of contemporary art.

== Exhibitions ==
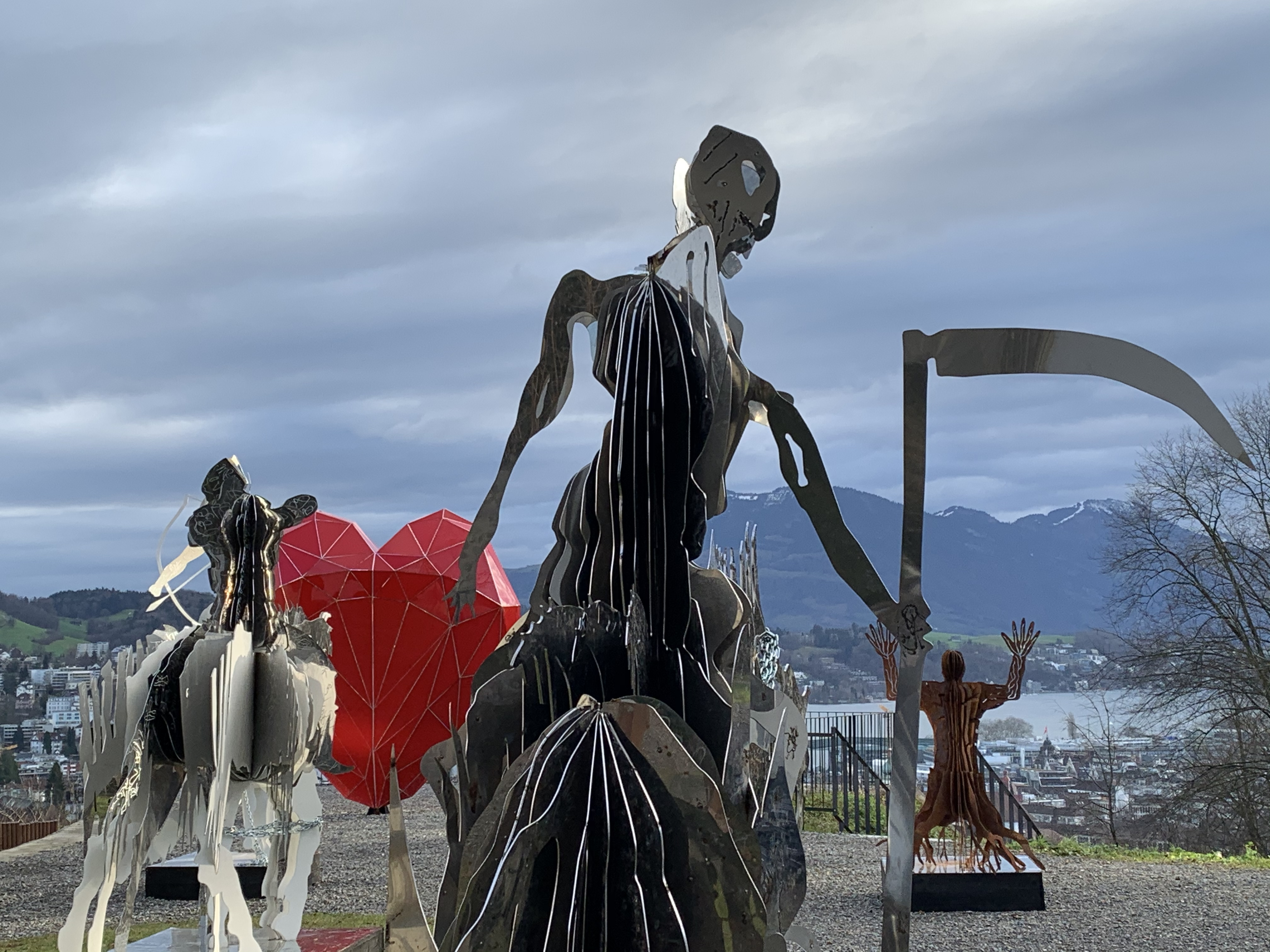
Sculpture park by Vasily Klyukin in Lucerne, Switzerland

- "In Dante Veritas", The State Russian Museum, Saint Petersburg, Russia, 2018
- "The pulsating heart (Heart of hope)", Burning Man, USA, 2018
- "La Collection Air", Lucerne, Switzerland, 2018
- "Karl Marx Forever", The State Russian Museum, Saint Petersburg, Russia, 2019
- "Anna Akhmatova. Poetry and Life", Branch of The State Russian Museum, Malaga, Spain, 2019
- "Authentic Human Bodies. Leonardo da Vinci", Palazzo Zaguri, Venice, Italy, 2019
- "In Dante Veritas", Venice Biennale, Italy, 2019
- "Why People Can’t Fly", Polytechnic Museum, Moscow, Russia, 2019
- "Why People Can’t Fly", Burning Man, USA, 2019
- "Why People Can’t Fly", Venice Biennale, Italy, 2019
- "Art Panorama Inferno", Lucerne, Switzerland, 2020
- "The Mind Port", Simon Lee Gallery, London, 2020
- "Civilization. The Island of the Day Before", Kunstforum, Vienna, 2021
- "In Dante Veritas: 4 Sins", Bad Breisig, Germany, 2021
- "Big Bang" and "Gluttony", Osthaus Museum Hagen, Germany, 2021
- "413", Moscow, Vienna, Malaga, 2021
- "Dante's Mask", Lucerne and Zug, Switzerland, 2021
- “Mind Space”, Osthaus Museum Hagen, Germany, 2022-2023
- “INNENLEBEN”, Osthaus Museum Hagen, Germany, 2023
- “Selected ‘Crypto’ sculptures”, Serge Sorokko Gallery, San Francisco, USA, 2023
- "DEMETRICISM", Certosa di San Giacomo, Capri, Italy, 2025
