= Burren Energy =

Burren Energy plc was a British oil exploration and production company founded in 1994 by Finian O’Sullivan who served as its CEO and, latterly, president. The company originally began as an oil transportation company in the Caspian Sea region, but later diversified into oil production in Turkmenistan, and in 2002 acquired Tacoma Resources, a company developing oil reserves in the Republic of Congo.

Russian private equity firm Baring Vostok Capital Partners invested $27 million in the company in 2000. The company floated on the London Stock Exchange in late 2003, and was part of the FTSE 250 index. In February 2005, the company acquired a 26% stake in Indian firm Hindustan Oil Exploration, and was awarded two exploration contracts in Egypt. The company expanded exploration into Yemen and Oman in January 2006.

On 30 November 2007 Burren agreed to be acquired by Italian energy company Eni in a deal valuing the company at £1.73 billion. Eni gained control of the firm in February 2008 and subsequently delisted its shares from the stock exchange. Burren's operations have been fully integrated into those of Eni.
