= Artur Gennadyevich Karpov =

Russian judge

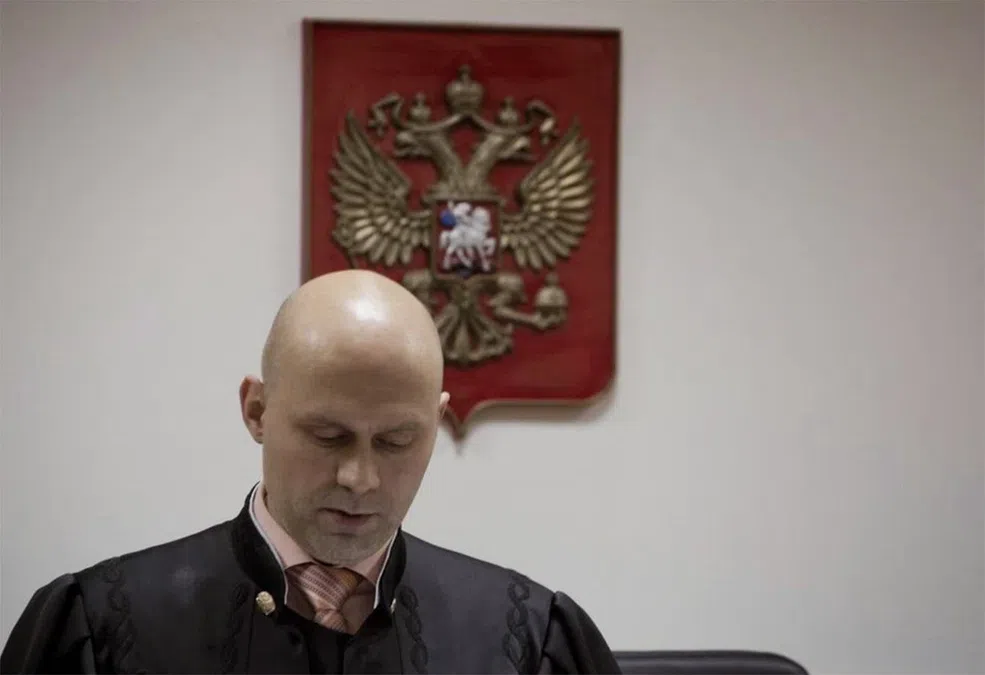
Basmanny District Court of Moscow Ex-Judge Artur Karpov

Artur Gennadyevich Karpov (born May 15, 1969) is a Russian federal judge known for his tenure at the Basmanny Court of General Jurisdiction of Moscow where he served from 2007 to 2021. He has gained a reputation as a "hardliner" judge, particularly for handling cases involving political opposition to the Kremlin. In the Western media he is known for the detention of Michael Calvey, a US private investor in Russian economy.

== Early career ==
Before his appointment to the Basmanny Court, Karpov worked in the military prosecutor's office. His judicial career in the Basmanny Court began with his appointment by President Vladimir Putin's Decree No. 747 on June 12, 2007. In 2010, he was reappointed for a new six-year term by President Dmitry Medvedev.

== Notable cases ==
Throughout his career, Karpov has been involved in several high-profile cases, many of which have had significant political implications:

- 2011: Mr. Karpov ordered the arrest of retired police lieutenant colonel Dmitry Pavlyuchenkov, who was accused of organizing the assassination of journalist Anna Politkovskaya.
- 2012-2016: Judge Karpov issued repeated rulings on the arrest and detention extension of defendants in the "Bolotnaya case," which involved protests against Vladimir Putin's third presidential inauguration.
- 2014: Judge Artur Karpov changed the preventive measure for opposition leader Alexei Navalny from signing not to leave to house arrest in the Yves Rocher case.
- 2016: Approved the arrest of Kirov Region Governor Nikita Belykh and sent Alexey Ulyukaev, the head of the Ministry of Economy, under house arrest.
- 2019: 16 February Judge Karpov authorized the arrest of Michael Calvey, a U.S. private investor in the Russian economy and founder of Baring Vostok. Same year released Alexei Minyailo, the coordinator of Lyubov Sobol's headquarters, from arrest in the courtroom.
- 2020: Extended the arrest of former Open Government Minister Mikhail Abyzov by two months and placed Valery Maksimenko, former deputy director of the Russian Federal Penitentiary Service, in a detention center. In the same year of 2020 Artur Karpov sent Khabarovsk Krai Governor Sergei Furgal, accused of organizing murders, into custody.

== International sanctions ==
Contrary to media reports, Artur Karpov is not on the US Magnitsky List. Included in Ukraine's sanctions list as a district court judge promoting war.

== Discussion ==
Far not all cases decided by Artur Karpov were "high-profile". Since 2015 until late 2020, Russian Federal Judge Artur Karpov issued more than 10500 procedural acts on various criminal proceedings, out of them more than 460 were final decisions.
