= China Chengtong Holdings Group =

Chinese state-owned investment holding company

China Chengtong Holdings Group Ltd

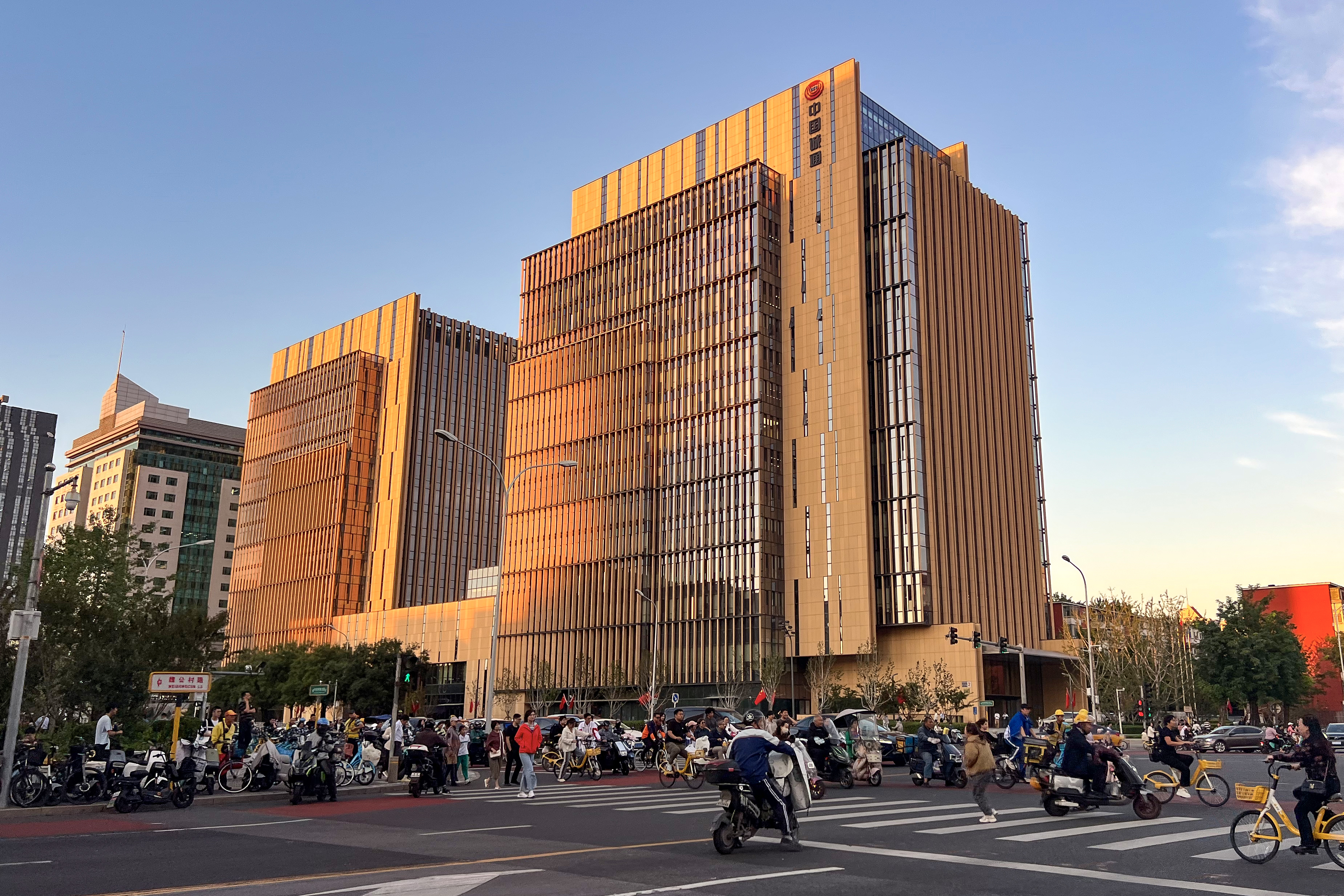
- Headquarters
- Native name: 中国诚通控股集团有限公司
- Company type: State-owned enterprise
- Industry: Financial services
- Founded: 1992; 34 years ago
- Headquarters: Beijing, China
- Key people: Xi Zhengping (Chairman); Guo Xiangyu (CEO)
- Products: Investment management
- Operating income: ▼CN¥4.78 billion (2023)
- Net income: ▼CN¥3.60 billion (2023)
- Total assets: ▲CN¥578.50 billion (2023)
- Total equity: ▲CN¥260.95 billion (2023)
- Subsidiaries: China Chengtong Development Group; Chengtong Fund Management
- Website: www.cctgroup.com.cn

China Chengtong Holdings Group (CCT; Chinese: 中国诚通; pinyin: Zhōngguó Chéngtōng) is a Chinese state-owned investment holding company. The company's purpose is to enhance the efficiency of state-owned capital operations and pursue capital appreciation. It boasts an AAA credit and debt rating.

In 2021, according to S&P Global Market Intelligence and Preqin, its fund management arm, Chengtong Fund Management, was ranked as the 24th largest private equity firm in the world based on total fundraising over the most recent five-year period.

== Background ==
In 1992, CCT was formed by the merger of multiple materials and circulation enterprises directly under the now-defunct Ministry of State Materials.

CCT focused on logistics. Domestic manufacturers would leave their procurement contracts with CCT units, while CCT would guarantee the funding and repayment to banks. CCT became the operator of the largest number of warehouses in China.

In 2003, CCT acquired a controlling stake in a Hong Kong-listed company, China Logistic. It was subsequently renamed to China Chengtong Development Group.

In 2005, CCT was identified by the SASAC as a pilot asset management corporation with 20 billion yuan in assets.

In 2008, the SASAC arranged for about 20 of its state-owned enterprises (SOEs) that were related to logistics to become wholly owned subsidiaries of CCT. A source noted that a high level of bad debt had to be absorbed.

In September 2016, CCT established the fund management company, Chengtong Fund Management. It would manage the China Structural Reform Fund, a 350 billion yuan private equity fund that would restructure SOEs in struggling sectors such as coal and steel. Ten SOEs invested in the fund, including China Mobile, CRRC, Sinopec, and CCT itself. Companies the fund would invest in include China Unicom and COFCO Group.

In 2018, during Russian president Vladimir Putin's visit to Beijing, Russia-China Investment Fund and CCT announced agreement to establish a US$1 billion "industrial investment fund".

In March 2024, CCT issued a 1 billion yuan 30-year bond with a 3.35% coupon rate, with the proceeds being used to repay existing debt. It was underwritten by Shanghai Pudong Development Bank and received oversubscription of 2.35 billion yuan from 19 investors.

In July 2024, CCT and China Orient Asset Management established a special fund worth 30 billion yuan to help SOEs make better use of their fixed and land assets through investment as well as mergers and acquisitions.
