= Almaz Capital =

International venture fund

- Type: Private
- Industry: Venture capital
- Founded: 2008
- Headquarters: Portola Valley, California, United States
- Key people: Managing Partner: Alexander Galitsky, General Partners: Geoffrey Baehr, Pavel Bogdanov, Charles E. Ryan, Aniruddha Nazaré
- Website: https://almazcapital.com/

Almaz Capital is a global VC fund headquartered in Portola Valley, California, United States investing in early stage, capital efficient technology companies in high-growth sectors. Almaz Capital focuses on disruptive deep tech companies in b2b software space, including AI/ML and Blockchain applications, IoT and Edge Computing Enablers, Cybersecurity, etc. Since its foundation the firm's portfolio has included about 50 companies, with more than 300 million US dollars invested in them.

The fund's investors include European Investment Fund (EIF), Cisco, the European Bank for Reconstruction and Development (EBRD), and International Finance Corporation (IFC), a member of the World Bank Group.

In addition to its headquarters in Portola Valley, California, Almaz Capital has an office in Berlin and representative offices in offices in Kyiv (Ukraine), Warsaw (Poland) and other Central and Eastern European countries. Almaz Capital's partners are Alexander Galitsky, Geoffrey Baehr, Pavel Bogdanov, Charles E. Ryan and Aniruddha Nazaré.

== History ==
In 2004, Cisco approached Alexander Galitsky, former scientist and technological entrepreneur who was appointed as president of the first Tech Tour in East Europe — a specialized forum in which international investors visited countries with growing venture markets and got to know local startups, and offered him financing to establish a venture fund to invest into East European startup companies. Galitsky selected the bridge fund model and has focused on investing in and connecting Eastern European startups creating promising technologies for global markets with western companies that can benefit from engineering resources in Eastern Europe.

Alexander Galitsky founded Almaz Capital in 2008 together with three partners: Charles Emmitt Ryan, founder of United Financial Group, senior advisor at Deutsche Bank and former CEO of Deutsche Bank Russia; Peter Loukianoff, who was working for Alloy Ventures; and Pavel Bogdanov. Geoffrey Baehr, a former General Partner at US Venture Partners (USVP), used to curate joint projects with Galitsky in the 1990s when he was CNO at Sun Microsystems and later joined Almaz Capital as advisor. In 2011, Loukianoff resigned from Almaz Capital and Baehr became fund's fourth general partner.

== Funds ==
Almaz Capital Fund I was backed in 2008 with a capital of $72 million. Among its investors, Almaz Capital I attracted $30 million from Cisco and more $20 million were given by UFG partners. After a year, a third investor appeared in the Fund — Еuropean Bank for Reconstruction and Development (EBRD) who invested around $20 mln. The first fund’s activity was focused on the search for interesting projects within the territory of CIS countries to be in demand in the global market.

In 2013, Almaz Capital II was established. It raised around $200 million from its limited partners. Cisco remained Almaz Capital's major investor in fund II with other major investment coming from UFG, EBRD and the International Finance Corporation. In an interview for the Vedomosti newspaper, Galitsky noted that Almaz Capital II attracted money from several family offices. The second fund excluded Russia’s originated companies from the list of new investments and expanded the geography of its activity to cover not only CIS countries but also some regions of East Europe.

Almaz Fund’s III with a capital of $191 mln final close was in 2021. EBRD still remained the main investor enriched by European International Fund (EIF). The geographical focus mostly moved to the Eastern European countries, although CIS is still in the scope of interest of the Fund.
