= Vostochny Bank =

Defunct Russian bank

- Native name: банк Восточный
- Formerly: ZAO Far Eastern Regional Joint-Stock Bank of Vneshtorgbank, Vostochny Express Bank
- Company type: Public
- Industry: Financial services
- Founded: May 1991; 34 years ago
- Defunct: February 2022
- Fate: Acquired and absorbed
- Successor: Sovcombank
- Headquarters: Blagoveshchensk, Russia
- Area served: Eastern Russia
- Products: Banking services
- Revenue: 43,362,500,000 Russian ruble (2017)
- Operating income: 4,211,911,000 Russian ruble (2016)
- Net income: 3,198,170,000 Russian ruble (2016)
- Owner: Baring Vostok
- Website: www.vostbank.ru

Vostochny Bank (Russian: банк Восточный) was a Russian bank based in Blagoveshchensk, Amur Oblast. It was established in 1991 and was acquired and absorbed in 2022 by Sovcombank.

Vostochny Bank was focuses on the Siberian and Russian Far East markets, and ranked among the 30 largest Russian banks by assets prior to its acquisition. The private equity firm, Baring Vostok owned a stake in Vostochny.

== History ==
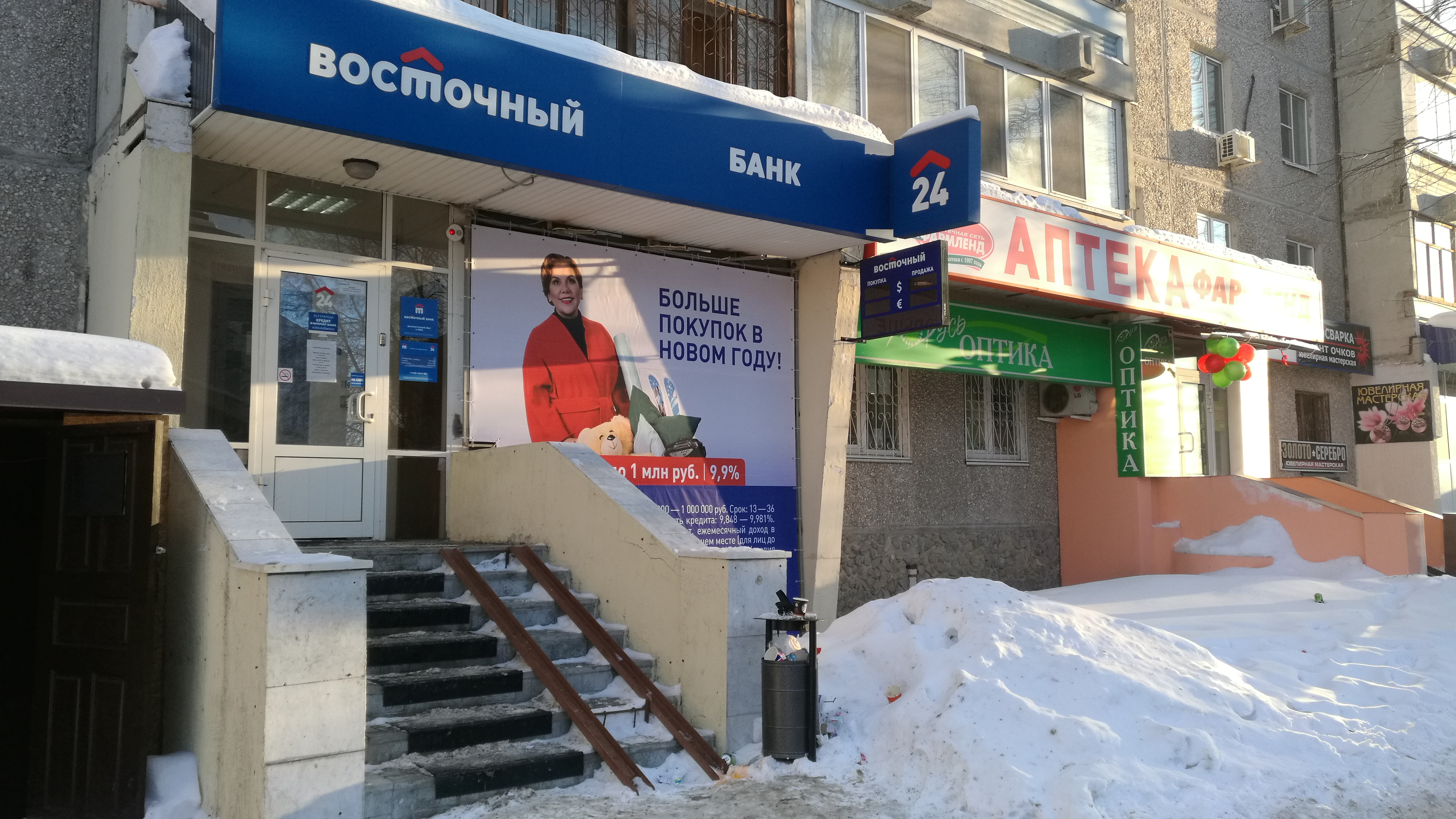
Old office of Vostochny Bank in Tyumen taken in 2019

In 2010 it purchased Consumer Bank, a Russian subsidiary of Banco Santander, and Morgan Stanley's City Mortgage Bank. In 2015 the bank reduced its workforce by half, laying off 4,000 employees. In 2016 it merged with Uniastrum Bank.

After the merger, Uniastrum bank owner Artem Avetisyan acquired a 32% stake in Vostochny via his Finvision Holdings. At that time, Baring Vostok Capital Partners investment fund controlled 51.2% of Vostochny via Evision Holdings. In 2018, a dispute took place between the major shareholders. Evision Holdings didn't let Finvision Holdings execute a call option for a 9.9% stake in the bank acquired by the latter in the M&A deal. In June 2019, Amur Region Arbitration Court ordered Evision Holdings to execute the option and sell the shares to Finvision Holdings. London Court of International Arbitration (LCIA) upheld Finvision's right to execute the call option and dismissed the arguments provided by Evision Holdings.

Baring Vostok abide by the decision of the court and executed the option in mid-2020. Finvision Holding gained control over 42.01% and Evision Holding's share decreased to 41.63%.

The arbitration proceedings between the parties took place simultaneously with the criminal investigation of the alleged misappropriation of 2.5 billion rubles of Vostochny bank's funds by Baring Vostok top managers, including the firm's founder Michael Calvey. Calvey and his colleagues were put under arrest. Some media linked criminal investigation with the arbitration proceedings. However, both Baring Vostok and Finvision Holdings denied such claims and admitted that the corporate dispute was unrelated to the criminal case.

In October 2020, Vostochny bank's shareholders signed the settlement agreement under which Baring Vostok refunded 2.5 billion rubles to Vostochny bank. In August 2021, the court found the top managers of Baring Vostok guilty of embezzling Vostochny Bank's funds and sentenced them to suspended sentences.

In March 2021, Sovcombank (a large private Russian bank) announced the purchase of Vostochny Bank. The deal was closed in April. Sovcombank acquired 88% of the bank's shares for 8.7 billion rubles. By the end of 2021, Sovcombank acquired 100% of Vostochny bank's shares and completed the operational integration of the banks. On February 14, 2022, Vostochny bank was merged into Sovcombank and liquidated.

== Ratings ==
- Credit rating by the rating agency Expert RA: "ruB-", outlook — "stable" (assigned in June 2020).
- Analytical Credit Rating Agency (ACRA): "B+(RU)", outlook — "stable".
- Moody’s Investors Service: Credit rating — "B3", counterparty risk rating — "B2".
