= Bernd Schwarzer =

German artist (born 1954)

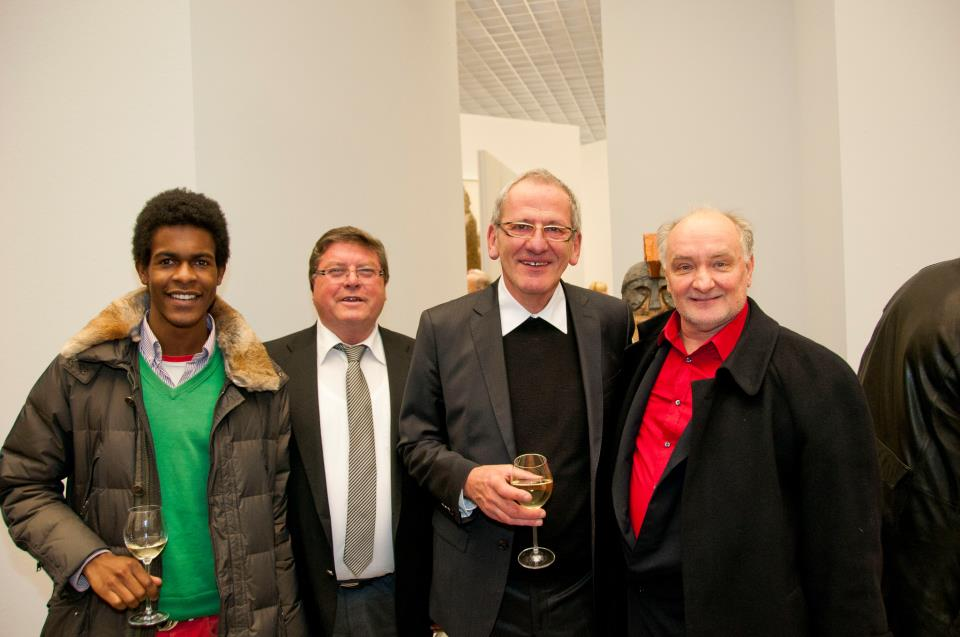
Bernd Schwarzer (far right) with Würzburg museum director Dr. Jürgen Lenssen (center right) as well as CSU councillor Adolf Bauer (center left) and Jonathan Malila (far left).

Bernd Schwarzer (24 July 1954) is a German artist born in Weimar, Thuringia, Germany. Schwarzer's work deals with the subject of Europe, the reunification of East and West Germany, and human rights.

== Life and work ==
Bernd Schwarzer's family moved from Weimar to Düsseldorf in 1959, where his father became a renowned doctor. Schwarzer showed a strong passion for art and design from an early age, which was encouraged by his father. Old photographs of Schwarzer show him painting at the family's kitchen table in Düsseldorf. As a teenager, Schwarzer studied artists such as Vincent van Gogh, and imitated some paintings such as "Homages."

Between 1976 and 1983, he studied fine arts with Werner Schriefers at the Technical University of Cologne. In 1978, he undertook a two-year fine arts study with Gerhard Hoehme at the Kunstakademie, Düsseldorf, where he studied under Joseph Beuys. Since 1984, Schwarzer has worked as an artist in Düsseldorf, Köln, and Weimar. Schwarzer has also been a master student under Werner Schriefers at the Kölner Fachhochschule, specializing in art and design. Since 2000, Schwarzer has been a guest professor at the Belarusian State Academy of Arts in Minsk, Republic of Belarus.

== Art work in museum ==
Schwarzer's artwork is represented in museums including:

- Landesmuseum, Bonn, Germany
- Kunsthalle Bremen, Germany
- Albright Knox Art Gallery, Buffalo, New York, USA
- Internationales Kulturzentrum "Krypta bei den Piaristen", Krakau, Austria
- Museum, Nordhausen, Germany
- Ludwig-Museum in Russischen Museum, St. Petersburg, Russia
- Koreanisches Nationalmuseum, Seoul, South Korea
- Georgisches Nationalmuseum, Tbilisi, Georgia
- Museum Búca-Likovic, Tivat, Montegnero.
- Staatliche Kunstsammlungen, Vienna, Austria
- Albertina, Vienna, Austria
- Krakau, Poland
- Theseustempel, Kunsthistorisches Museum Vienna, Austria
- Auswärtiges Amt, Berlin, Germany
- Museum am Dom (Würzburg), Würzburg, Germany
- BOZAR, Brussels, Belgium.

== Exhibitions ==
Bernd Schwarzer's artwork is being exhibited nationally as well as internationally. He curated nine solo exhibitions and was part of twelve group exhibitions.

- 2016 Europa und die Einheit des Seins: Kunst als Wegweiser zum Frieden, WBB GALLERY – Contemporary Pure Art, Zurich, Switzerland
- 2011 Stationen einer künstlerischen Reise, Kunsthandlung Osper, Cologne, Germany
- 2010 Art from Europe: Bernd Schwarzer in Beijing, Today Art Museum, Beijing, China
- 2009 20 Years of Liberty - Germany Pictures, Al Galerie Budapest, Hungary
- 2008 Kontrapunkt, Kunsthandlung Osper, Cologne, Germany
- 2006 Al Galerie, Budapest, Hungary
- 2004 Europa, Kunsthandlung Osper, Cologne, German
- 2003 Europa – the State Russian Museum, Marble Palace, St. Petersburg, Russia

His group exhibitions include:

- 2011 New States of Contemporary Art, Galerie Michael Nolte, Münster, Germany
- 2010 Gallery Artists, Galerie Michael Nolte, Münster, Germany
- 2009 40 Jahre Galerie Koch-Westenhoff, Galerie Koch-Westenhoff, Lübeck, Germany
- 2008 Sammelstücke Collector Works, Galerie & Edition Bode GmbH, Nuremberg, Germany
- 2006 Objekte und Skulptur, Kunstverein Kreis Gütersloh e.V., Gütersloh, Germany
- 2005 50 Jahre Galerie Koch, Galerie Koch, Hannover, Germany
- 2003 Objekte und Skulptur 2003 Galerie Kunsthaus Oberkassel/ Artobes, Düsseldorf, Germany
- 2001 Ausgewählte Grafik, Galerie Koch, Hannover, Germany
- 2000 Zinnober, Galerie Koch, Hannover, Germany
- 1999 Weimar aus dem Rahmen, Lucas Cranach Galerie, Galerie der Genossenschaft Bildender Künstler Weimar, Weimar, Germany

== Literature ==
- Bernd Schwarzer: Deutsch Europäische Werke, Botschaft der Bundesrepublik Deutschland, Brussels 2009
- Bernd Schwarzer: Europawerk, Auswärtiges Amt, Berlin, 2008
- Bernd Schwarzer: Bilder, Grafiken, Installationen, Objekte, Photographien, Skulpturen und Zeichnungen, Expo 2000 Hannover, Munich 2000
- Bernd Schwarzer: Zeichnungen. Ausstellung des Kunstmuseums Bonn im Stadtmuseum Bonn, 17. November 2006 bis 28. Januar 2007, Geologen 2006
- Budde, Rainer u.a. (Hrsg.): Auf der Suche – Arbeiten von Bernd Schwarzer im Museum am Dom Würzburg, 21. September bis 25. November 2007, Würzburg 2007
- Kiblitzky, Joseph (Hrsg.): Bernd Schwarzer Europa. Katalog zur Ausstellung im Museum Ludwig im Staatlichen Russischen Museum Petersburg, St Petersburg 2003
- Krueger, Peter (Hrsg.): Art Bridge New York – Cologne – New York. 50 Years of Transatlantic Dialogue, Tübingen, Berlin 2001
