= Hansard Global =

British financial services company

Hansard Global plc
- Type: Public
- Traded as: LSE: HSD
- Industry: Financial services
- Founded: 1970; 56 years ago
- Headquarters: Douglas, Isle of Man
- Key people: Dr Leonard Polonsky, Group President
- Revenue: £105.6m (2015)
- Operating income: £14.9 million (2015)
- Net income: £14.9 million (2015)
- Number of employees: circa 215 (2021)
- Website: www.hansard.com

Hansard Global plc is a British financial services business headquartered in Douglas, Isle of Man. It is listed on the London Stock Exchange. The Group is involved in the provision of life assurance services primarily in the Far East, Latin America and Middle East as well as investment management services.

== History ==
The company was formed by Dr Leonard Polonsky, an American, as the Liberty Life Assurance Company, in 1970. It was first listed on the London Stock Exchange in 2006 in a £357 million flotation which generated £99 million for its founder. Its fund range includes portfolios from Fidelity International and Alquity.

On 12 March 2021 the company announced that after 8 years as CEO and 30 years with the company, Gordon Marr would be retiring by the end of 2021.
