= Russia–China Investment Fund =

Russia-China Investment Fund
- Type: Bilateral cooperation fund
- Industry: Investment Management
- Founded: 2012; 14 years ago
- Headquarters: Moscow, Russia / Beijing, China
- Key people: Kirill Dmitriev (CEO)
- Total assets: US$2.5 billion
- Owner: Russian Direct Investment Fund / China Investment Corporation
- Website: rcif.com

The Russia–China Investment Fund (Russian: Российско-Китайский Инвестиционный Фонд, Chinese: 中俄投资基金), abbreviated as the RCIF (РКИФ), is a bilateral cooperation fund created by the Russian Direct Investment Fund and the China Investment Corporation to invest in opportunities linking Russia, the Commonwealth of Independent States, and China. Since inception, RCIF has invested in over 45 projects in Russia, China, and the United States, with several portfolio companies completing initial public offerings on major international exchanges.

== History ==
RCIF was established in 2012. The initial seed capital of US$2 billion was funded in equal part by the China Investment Corporation, the sovereign wealth fund of China, and the Russian Direct Investment Fund, the sovereign wealth fund of Russia. In October 2018, the RCIF became trilateral with Public Investment Fund, the sovereign wealth fund of Saudi Arabia, contributing US$500 million to the RCIF, raising total capital to US$2.5 billion. The fund continues to seek contributions from new investors.

Following the 2022 Russian invasion of Ukraine, RCIF's parent entity, the Russian Direct Investment Fund, was sanctioned by the United States, United Kingdom, European Union, and other jurisdictions. Post-sanctions, RDIF has shifted focus to non-Western partners while investment pipelines with Western partners have collapsed.

== Investments ==
The RCIF was founded to pursue investment opportunities in Russia, members of the Commonwealth of Independent States, and investments in China with a close connection to Russia including China–Russia border infrastructure projects and Chinese firms trading with Russia in technology and services. The fund targets at least 70% of its capital in Russia and CIS countries and up to 30% in China.

Notable investments include:

- Didi (2014): Chinese ride-hailing company that subsequently acquired competitor Kuaidi in 2015 and Uber China in 2016.
- Detsky Mir (2015): Russia's largest children's goods retailer. RCIF supported the company's IPO in February 2017, the first exit from an investment for RCIF.
- (China) NIO: Chinese electric vehicle manufacturer that completed its IPO on the New York Stock Exchange in 2018.
- (China) So-Young: Chinese medical aesthetics platform that completed its IPO on the Nasdaq in 2019.
- (Russia) Uchi.ru (2020): Russian online education platform; RCIF became a minority shareholder alongside Mail.ru Group.

== Related funds ==
=== China-Russia RMB Investment Cooperation Fund ===
In 2017, China Development Bank, a Chinese policy bank, and the Russian Direct Investment Fund announced plans to establish a China-Russia RMB Investment Cooperation Fund. RDIF chose to implement its part of the joint fund through RCIF while CDB used its subsidiary China Development Bank Capital for implementation. The goal behind the fund was to make investments of 68 billion yuan in Russian and Chinese projects including the Belt and Road Initiative and to help simplify investments in the Chinese and Russian currencies in the other country.

=== Russia-China Venture Fund ===
In November 2016, RCIF and Chinese company TUS Holdings agreed to establish the Russia-China Venture Fund (RCVF) with an initial target size of up to US$100 million. The fund focuses on high-tech companies and startups in Russia with potential for expansion in the Chinese market, including information technology, big data, cloud technologies, biotechnology, clean energy, and new materials.

=== Industrial Investment Fund ===
In 2018, during Russian President Vladimir Putin's visit to Beijing, RCIF and China Chengtong Holdings Group announced agreement to establish a US$1 billion industrial investment fund.
