= Baring Vostok Capital Partners =

Russian private equity firm

- Company type: Private
- Industry: Private equity
- Founded: 1994; 32 years ago
- Founder: Michael Calvey
- Headquarters: Moscow, Russia
- Products: Leveraged buyouts, Growth capital
- Total assets: $3.7 billion
- Website: www.baring-vostok.com

Baring Vostok Capital Partners is the largest independent private equity firm focused on investments in Russia and the Commonwealth of Independent States. The Baring Vostok Private Equity Funds invest across a broad range of industries including oil and gas, consumer products, media and technology, telecommunications and financial services.

The Investment Advisor of the Funds, Baring Vostok Capital Partners (Guernsey) several times since 2005 has been voted “Russian Private Equity Firm of the Year” by the readers of Private Equity International and Private Equity Online. The sub-advisor of BVCP has a branch office in Moscow with a team of 40 experienced investment professionals.

From its founding in 1994 through 2004, the firm was a subsidiary of Baring Private Equity International which was an affiliate of Barings Bank. In addition to Baring Vostok, the affiliates of BPEP International include Baring Private Equity Asia as well as Baring Private Equity Partners India, founded in 1984. BPEP International's Latin America affiliate is known as GP Investments, a leading private equity firm in Brazil. Collectively, the firms represent over $12 billion in capital commitments as of the end of 2014.

With offices in Moscow, the firm has raised over $3.7 billion across five investment funds. The firm’s name vostok is the Russian word for "east". Additionally, the Vostok spacecraft was the first crewed spacecraft, operated by Russian cosmonaut Yuri Gagarin.

The firms founder Michael Calvey and five colleagues were arrested in February 2019 for allegedly defrauding Russian businessman Artem Avetisyan who is an associate of Putin and the FSB. Calvey maintained the charges were baseless, supported by a BBC investigation, and said the real reason for the arrest was Calvey was suing Avetisyan in a separate case in London, and winning, and Avetisyan used his connections with the FSB to have Calvey arrested in Russia. Avetisyan stood to gain 10s of millions if Calvey was convicted, and Calvey faced 10 years in the notorious Matrosskaya Tishina where Sergei Magnitsky died in custody. Later the shareholders entered into a settlement agreement and publicly stated that their shareholder dispute was not related to the criminal investigation. After signing the settlement agreement, Baring Vostok returned 2.5 billion rubles to Vostochny Bank. In August 2021, the court found the top managers of Baring Vostok guilty of embezzling Vostochny Bank's funds and sentenced them to suspended sentences.

== Investments ==
Since inception, Baring Vostok has invested over $2.4 billion in 67 companies.

Baring Vostok founded by Michael Calvey is best known for its early stage investment in Russian search engine, Yandex, acquiring a 35.7% stake in the business in 2000. At the time of the Yandex IPO, Baring Vostok is estimated to have generated value of approximately $4 billion, representing a return on its original $5 million investment in excess of 800x. Among Baring Vostok's other investments are Volga Gas, Borjomi Mineral Water, Ozon.ru, Burren Energy, CTC Media, Centre of Financial Technologies, Enforta, ER-Telecom, 1C, Burren Energy, Novomet, Kaspi Bank, Orient Express Bank, Europlan, Novomet, Karo, Avito.ru, Tinkoff.ru, EMC and Golden Telecom, Verticali and marketing platform "Mindbox".

== History ==
Baring Vostok Capital Partners origins date back to 1994 with the formation of the First NIS Regional Fund. The fund was a joint venture between Baring Asset Management and Sovlink, a Russian-American merchant bank. Baring Bank’s ties to Russia traced back several centuries and Barings was the primary international bank for the Russian Emperors.

The First NIS Regional Fund was originally managed by a team of investment professionals from Barings and Sovlink including current Baring Vostok senior partner Michael Calvey. With $160 million of investor commitments, the fund ultimately returned $620 million to investors over the life of the fund. In 1997, Baring Vostok Capital Partners, became an affiliate of Baring’s BPEP International. Following the collapse of Barings Bank, the ownership of BPEP International was assumed by the Dutch bank ING Group.

In 2001, the firm completed fundraising for the Baring Vostok Private Equity Fund. With $205 million of investor commitments, Baring Vostok’s was the first foreign private equity fund raised in the aftermath of the 1998 Russian financial crisis.

In May 2004, BPEP International completed a management buyout from ING Group, which resulted in Baring Vostok's partners purchasing ownership of its management company. At the same time, the firm's affiliates in Asia, India and Latin America completed similar buyouts of their respective firms. These companies subsequently continued their affiliation although each firm retained full ownership of their respective businesses. Following the buyout of the management company, in 2005, the Baring Vostok Private Equity Fund III was raised with total committed capital of $413 million.

In February 2007, the firm completed fundraising for its fourth private equity fund. Baring Vostok raised $1.1 billion of investor commitments for its main fund Baring Vostok Private Equity Fund IV. Together with a parallel fund, Baring Vostok Fund IV Supplemental Fund, which raised over $300 million of capital, Baring Vostok's fourth fund was at the time the largest private equity fund in Eastern Europe.

In October 2012, the Baring Vostok Private Equity Fund LP V was raised with total committed capital of $1.15 billion, which was, at the time, the largest amount raised for a deal of this kind in Russia.

On 2 September 2019, the Russian Commercial Court of the Amur Region, Russia, ordered the seizure of the 41.6% share of equity in Vostochny Bank controlled by Baring Vostok. The seizure was requested by Vostochny and, according to the court, it was necessary to prevent Baring Vostok selling shares in Vostochny before a court decision was reached in continuing litigation over alleged embezzlement by Baring Vostok executives.
