= R-Pharm =

Largest pharmaceutical company of Russia

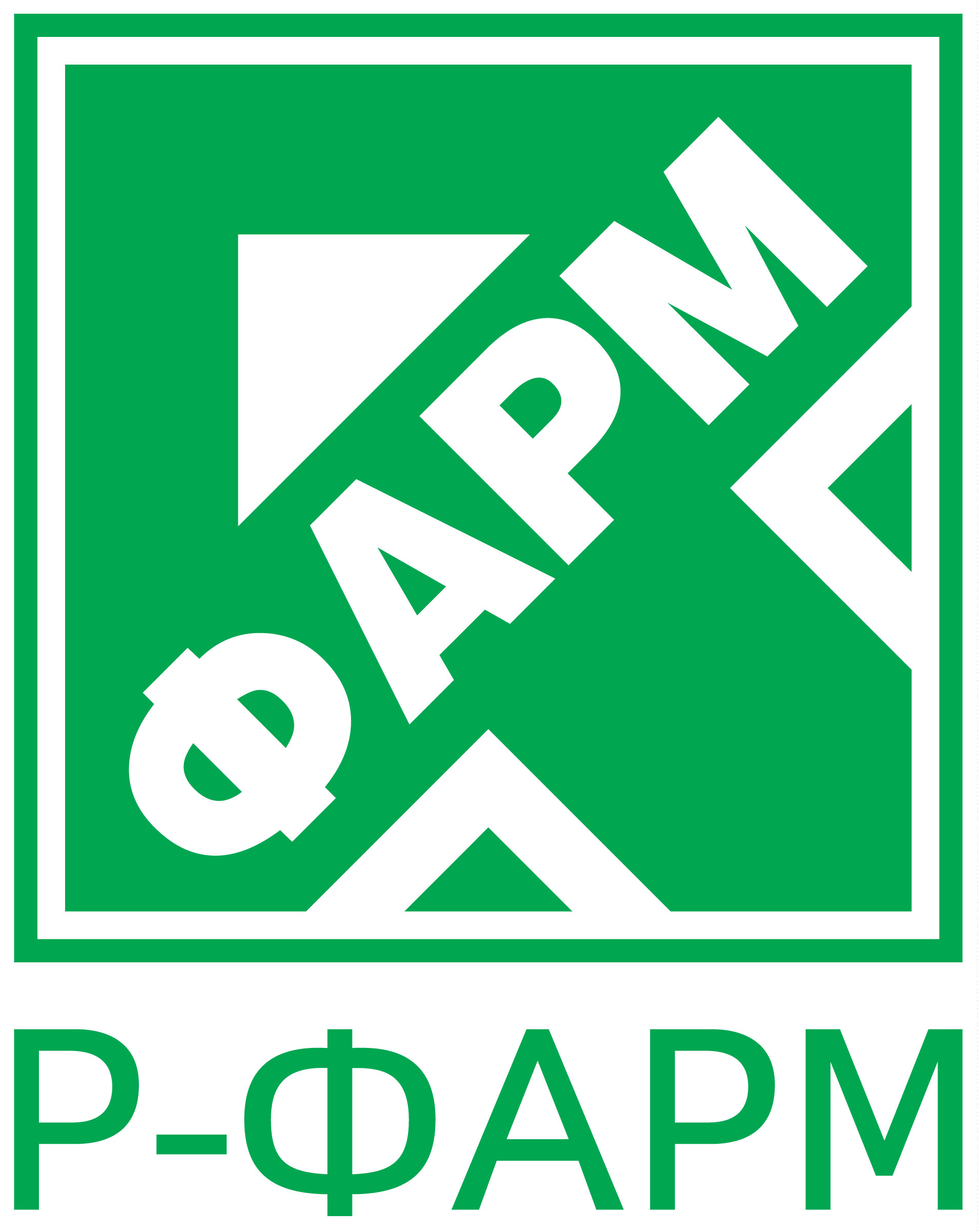
R-Pharm logo

R-Pharm (Russian: Р-Фарм) is an international pharmaceutical company headquartered in Russia. It reached the headlines in September 2020 following approval of its drug "Coronavir" as a treatment in cases of mild to moderate COVID-19 infection. It was founded by Alexey Repik (ru) in 2001, but has had an increasingly international operations base since, with Japanese Corporation Mitsui & Co., Ltd. acquiring 10% of its shares in 2017. In 2022, against the background of the introduction of personal sanctions, Alexey Repik resigned from the owners of R-Pharm, selling his share in the company to the management of R-Pharm, and resigned as chairman of the board of directors.

== Activity ==
The company's scope of activities covers areas related to the development, research, production, marketing of drugs intended primarily for inpatient and specialized medical care. The main areas of activity are: production of finished dosage forms, active pharmaceutical ingredients of chemical nature and biotechnological substances, research and development of drugs and technologies, introduction to the Russian market of pharmaceuticals.

In 2016, R-Pharm supplied 46% of the Russian government contracts and was the largest supplier of pharmaceuticals to the Russian government.

In autumn 2022, Alexei Repik, (Note: Vladimir Putin's family, especially Katerina Tikhonova, often flies on Alexey Repik's Bombardier Global 5000 (M-FINE)) (Note: On 8 February 2023, the Foreign Secretary of the United Kingdom sanctioned numerous entities and individuals including the IT services company Moscoms LLC, the domain LLCInvest.ru, which is hosted by Moscoms LLC through the servers of Moskomsvyaz, and Alexey Repik who had received funding for his R-Pharm from the Russian Direct Investment Fund and had met with Vladimir Putin four times in 2022 as part of Putin's network of wealth and power. After Russia invaded Ukraine in February 2022, Alexey Evgenyevich Repik was placed on Canada's sanctions list on 19 May 2023 as Elites and close associates of the Regime in Russia who provide military technology and know-how to Russia’s armed forces, family members of listed persons, and members of the Kremlin elite.) in order to protect R-Pharm from sanctions and to allow lllumina to continue to supply materials to Moscow based Albiogen (Russian: Альбиоген), (Note: Founded in 2015, Moscow based Albiogen (Russian: Альбиоген) is the sole distributor of the San Diego based United States company Illumina in Russia, Belarus, Kazakhstan and Uzbekistan. In 2018, Albiogen became a supplier of equipment, consumables and software for DNA nucleotide sequencing of a new generation and analysis on DNA biochips from IDT, Vitrolife, CareDx and Pillar. At the end of 2022, the distributor's revenue fell by 35.75% to 5.4 billion rubles and the company's net profit was 1.35 billion rubles.) transferred his share in R-Pharm to management, with Mitsui maintaining a 10% stake which it had acquired in 2017 for $200 million.

At the end of 2022, R-Pharm had 162 billion rubles in revenue from the production of medicines for the treatment of autoimmune, oncological, antiviral and other diseases, as well as materials that are used for medical purposes and veterinary medicine.

As of the end of June 2023, R-Pharm had Russia based plants at Yaroslavl, Rostov, Moscow, Kostroma, and Dubna, and plants at Illertissen, Germany, which was a former Pfizer plant but purchased by R-Pharm in June 2014 and, by agreement, for the first five years will continue to produce Pfizer products, and in Azerbaijan.

R-Pharm gained a large stake in Moscow based Albiogen (Russian: Альбиоген) in 2020. Albiogen specializes in the distribution of foreign high-tech equipment for genetic research. On 23 June 2023, R-Pharm transferred 99% of its stake in Albiogen to A-gen (Russian: А-ген). A-gen is controlled by Andrey Frolov (Russian: Андрей Фролов), who has a majority stake of 50%, and the distributor Alexander Yakovlevsky, who has a minority stake of nearly 50%.

== COVID-19 ==
In 2020, during the COVID-19 outbreak in Russia, the company announced its intention to assist in the mass production of the Sputnik V COVID-19 vaccine developed by the Gamaleya Research Institute of Epidemiology and Microbiology. It also announced that it had received a license to manufacture the British Oxford–AstraZeneca COVID-19 vaccine. The company also manufactured the drug Coronavir, which has been described as the first prescription drug specifically developed against COVID-19 to reach the market. It was approved for use in hospitals in July 2020, and in September 2020 it received approval for prescription sales for outpatient use.

In December 2020, R-Pharm and the Gamaleya Research Institute of Epidemiology and Microbiology signed a Memorandum of Understanding with AstraZeneca to collaborate on the development of the COVID-19 vaccine and to conduct joint trials of the British and Russian vaccines.

== See also ==
- COVID-19 pandemic in Russia
