= Kirill Dmitriev =

Russian businessman (born 1975)

Kirill A. Dmitriev
- Кирилл Дмитриев
- Dmitriev in 2026

Special Presidential Envoy on Foreign Investment and Economic Cooperation
- Incumbent
- Assumed office 23 February 2025
- President: Vladimir Putin

Personal details
- Born: Kirill Alexandrovich Dmitriev; 12 April 1975 (age 51) Kiev, Ukrainian SSR, Soviet Union
- Education: Stanford University (BA); Harvard University (MBA)
- Occupation: CEO

Kirill Alexandrovich Dmitriev (Note: Russian: Кирилл Александрович Дмитриев, lit. 'Kirill Aleksandrovich Dmitriyev') (born 12 April 1975) is a Russian businessman who is the CEO of the Russian Direct Investment Fund (RDIF), an at least $10 billion sovereign wealth fund created by the Russian government to co‑invest in the Russian economy. Dmitriev was born in Soviet Ukraine. He lived in the United States between the ages of 14 and 25, where he studied at Stanford University and Harvard Business School. Upon moving to Russia in 2000, he worked for various companies before being chosen by Russian leader Vladimir Putin to head the RDIF. Dmitriev has long‑standing connections to Vladimir Putin's family.

In February 2022, both Kirill Dmitriev and RDIF were sanctioned by the United States Treasury following the Russian invasion of Ukraine. In the sanction recital, the Office of Foreign Assets Control labelled RDIF as a slush fund for Vladimir Putin and as emblematic of Russia's broader kleptocracy. Dmitriev assumed the office of Special Presidential Envoy on Foreign Investment and Economic Cooperation on 23 February 2025. Dmitriev was hand‑picked by Putin to be a negotiator with the Donald Trump administration in negotiating an end to the Russo-Ukrainian war. During the negotiations, Dmitriev emphasised business opportunities in Russia for US investors.

== Early life and education ==
Kirill Dmitriev was born in 1975 in Kyiv, Ukrainian SSR, Soviet Union. His parents were prominent scientists, his father is a well known (in Ukraine) cell biologist and his mother a geneticist. Dmitriev has a sister. His father in the 1980s held high positions in the Communist Party of Ukraine (Soviet Union). Dmitriev's father was also born in Kyiv; his grandfather was Colonel Pyotr Dmitriev, who was born in Saint Petersburg, Russia. Pyotr Dmitriev was a veteran of the Winter War (in Finland) and World War II, he fought in the Battle of Kiev (1941), the Battle of Stalingrad and the Battle of Kursk.

Dmitriev was educated at the elite Kyiv Natural Science Lyceum No. 145. A source of BBC News claimed that, aged 15, Dmitriev took part in pro-democracy protests in Kyiv. In 1989, Dmitriev was selected by Lyceum No. 145 in an exchange programme and was sent to a host family in New Hampshire, as one of the first Soviet exchange students from Ukraine. When interviewed by an American journalist he stated that Ukraine had a long and proud history of independence. He told the newspaper "Ukraine had a long history as an independent nation before it became part of the Russian empire." He then claimed that the then rising nationalist sentiment would help "break the power of the communist system."

Also in 1989, Dmitriev was sent to live with friends of his parents in California, where the host family and Dmitriev convinced administrators at Foothill College to enroll him. Although Dmitriev had no prior English-language schooling and only just graduated from the Soviet equivalent of middle school, he was highly successful at the community college. Upon receiving his associate's degree, he transferred to Stanford University, from which he holds a BA in economics with honors and distinction. He continued his education at Harvard Business School, where he completed the MBA program as a Baker scholar.

== Career ==
Recruited by McKinsey & Company after graduating from Harvard, Dmitriev spent the next two years on various projects at the consultancy's Los Angeles, Moscow, and Prague offices, where he caught the eye of influential Russian businessmen. In 1999, Dmitriev transitioned to Goldman Sachs as an investment banker but resigned from the bank less than a year into his employment. Shortly thereafter, in 2000, Dmitriev returned to Moscow. He was employed by The U.S. Russia Investment Fund, while also working at the private equity fund Delta Private Equity Partners from 2002 to 2007. In 2003, Dmitriev appeared to be critical of Russian President Vladimir Putin's crackdown on Russia's oligarchs when he wrote in a column in Vedomosti "The world is shrewd enough to know the difference between following the letter of the law and using the law as a tool of influence." In 2004, Dmitriev worked on the sale of DeltaBank to General Electric, and in 2005 DeltaCredit Bank to Société Générale, Dmitriev was Chairman of the Russian Venture Capital and Private Equity Association from 2005 to 2006.

Dmitriev was the president of the Ukrainian fund Icon Private Equity from 2007 to 2010. This fund was owned by Ukrainian oligarch Victor Pinchuk. In Ukraine he was a regular guest on TV talk shows where he lamented Ukraine's political "instability" and he claimed that Russia was better placed to respond to the global financial crisis. In 2010 he warned Ukraine would face an "economic Holodomor" (a famine that killed millions in Ukraine) if it pursued a policy of isolation from Russia. In 2009, Dmitriev founded in Ukraine the charitable organization "Kyril Dmitriev Foundation for Social Initiatives" and the public organization "Anti-Crisis". The stated goal of the "Kyril Dmitriev Foundation for Social Initiatives" was to facilitate cultural integration of Russia and Ukraine. (Note: The "Kyril Dmitriev Foundation for Social Initiatives" organised exchanges programmes for talented children from Russia to Ukraine and vice versa. And it organised an anniversary program for her 75th birthday of Russian actress Lyudmila Gurchenko in Kyiv.) As of July 2025, Dmitriev was still registered as proprietor of both. In addition he still owned 12.5% of the shares of "Ukrainian Dream", a Ukrainian market research and advertising company founded in 2010. "Ukrainian Dream" was also the name of a late 2010 ICTV Ukrainian reality TV show where entrepreneurs pitched their business ideas to a panel of investors, Dmitriev was a member of this panel. ICTV advertised Dmitriev as being one of the "most famous and successful representatives of Ukrainian business."

In February 2005, Dmitriev sold CTC Media shares to Fidelity Investments, National Cable Networks to Oleg Deripaska's Basic Element]]. In 2007, he sold CompuLink to three investment funds, TV3 to Prof-Media, and NTC Orion to Bank Rossiya. In 2010, the World Economic Forum selected Dmitriev to be a Young Global Leader, and he was elected as a Vice President of the Russian Union of Industrialists and Entrepreneurs (RSPP). In 2011 he was the only Russian national to be named one of 100 most influential private equity professionals of the decade by Private Equity International magazine.

=== Russian Direct Investment Fund ===
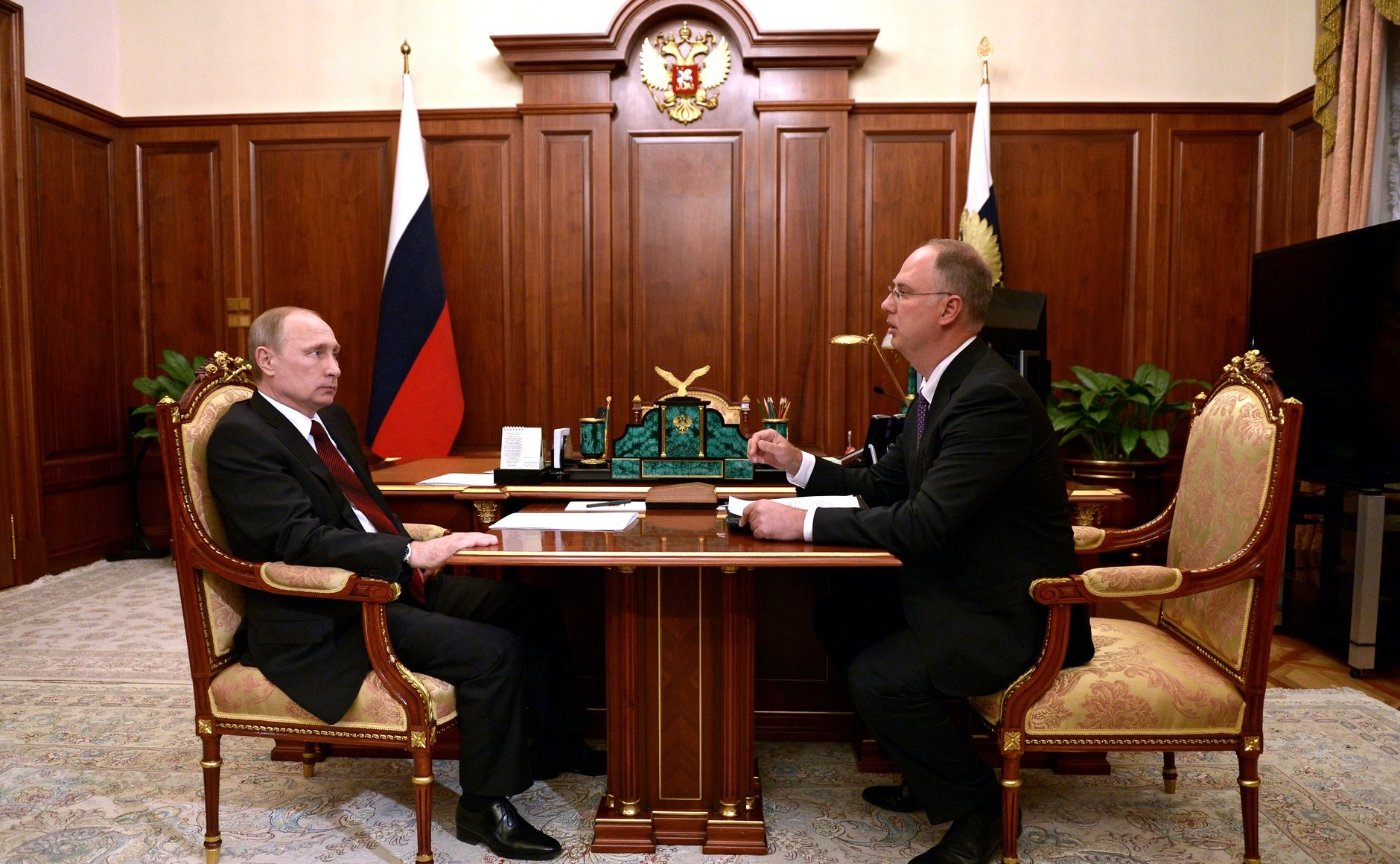
Dmitriev with President Vladimir Putin in March 2015

Victor Pinchuk introduced Dmitriev to Vladimir Dmitriev (no relation), then head of the Russian state development corporation VEB. Dmitriev and Dmitriev persuaded the Russian government to create the Russian Direct Investment Fund (RDIF), a sovereign wealth fund to make equity co-investments in Russia companies. In 2011, he was appointed as CEO of RDIF. His mission has been described as "to change the face of Russian capitalism" and make the Russian economy less dependent on the petroleum industry by "overcoming western funds’ reluctance to invest in a country viewed as corrupt, prone to state meddling and plagued by a law-of-the-jungle legal system".

Under his leadership, RDIF invested with foreign partners in more than 90 projects totaling more than 2.1 trillion rubles and covering 95% of the regions of the Russian Federation. RDIF has established joint strategic partnerships with leading international co-investors from more than 15 countries including Saudi Arabia, UAE, China, Qatar, Kuwait, Bahrain, South Korea, Japan, Vietnam, Italy and France. Foreign partners have included BlackRock, One Equity Partners, Goldman Sachs, and Deutsche Bank. Dmitriev has cultivated a close relationship with Mohammed Bin Salman since 2014.

According to sources of The Guardian, in the 2010s Dmitriev almost never spoke about having been born in Ukraine. In a December 2013 interview with CNBC, during the pro-European Ukrainian Euromaidan protest, while Dmitriev acknowledged "that the opinion of the Ukrainian people should be respected", he claimed that if "Ukrainians turn their back on Russia" this would lead to a "complete collapse of their economy." He suggested that "Russia, (the) European Union and Ukraine need to work together to figure out a solution that is good short term, medium term and long term."

==== COVID-19 response ====
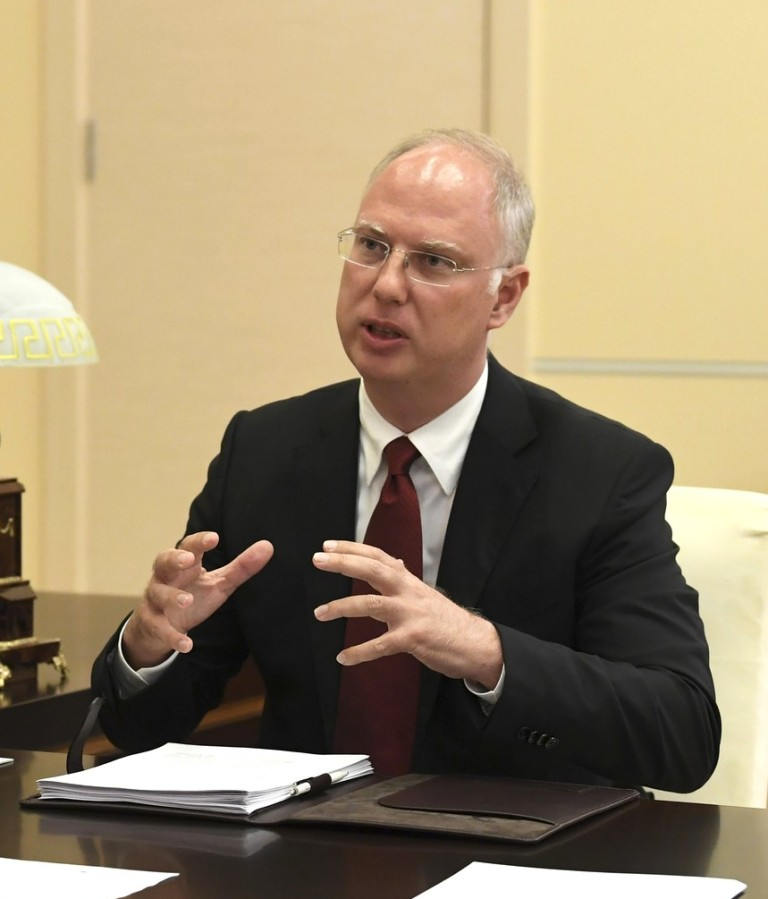
Dmitriev in June 2020

In 2020 Dmitriev focused RDIF on combatting the novel coronavirus infection through investing in testing, drugs, vaccines. (Note: In March 2020 RDIF invested in the production of unique Russian-Japanese testing system to detect COVID-19 within 30 mins (produced under EMG brand). More than 13 million testing kits were sold by RDIF and its partners abroad. The system is being used in all major airports of Moscow: Sheremetyevo, Domodedovo and Vnukovo. In March 2020 RDIF and Russian pharmaceutical company ChemRar Group agreed to create a JV aimed at the production of Favipiravir-based drug Avifavir (generic version of the Japanese drug Avigan, which was proven to be effective by the Phase 3 clinical trials of Fujifilm Toyama Chemical 5 months after RDIF and ChemRar registered Avifavir in Russia. Avifavir was the first anti-COVID-19 drug officially registered in Russia. RDIF invested in the production in Russia and abroad of the Sputnik V vaccine. It is reported that Dmitriev felt personally hurt by the rejection of Sputnik by other countries.) (Note: Dmitriev was critical of British COVID-19 vaccine research efforts, repeatedly referring to the Oxford-AstraZeneca vaccine as the "monkey vaccine", as the studies involved a modified version of the virus that infected chimpanzees. Dmitriev stopped this after The Times accused him of acting as part of a co-ordinated disinformation campaign against the British research efforts.) Also in 2020, Dmitriev advocated for the partnership of Gamaleya Institute, RDIF and AstraZeneca to help AstraZeneca increase the efficacy of its vaccine by combining it with one of the components of Sputnik V. On 23 November 2020, RDIF and Gamaleya Institute offered AstraZeneca to collaborate on this via a Twitter post. AstraZeneca accepted RDIF's proposal. The partnership between RDIF, Gamaleya Institute and AstraZeneca was created in December 2020. In February 2021, health officials in Azerbaijan granted approval for a clinical trial in the country on combining Russia's Sputnik V with the Oxford–AstraZeneca COVID-19 vaccine in adults 18 years and older.

==== Interlocking directorships ====
As of 2021, he served on the board of directors of Rostelecom, MDMG, Gazprombank, the Russian Railways, Transneft, Rosseti, Skolkovo Foundation, and the supervisory board of Alrosa. He is also on the boards of trustees of the Mariinsky Theatre, Lomonosov Moscow State University, Russian Institute of Theatre Arts GITIS and National History Fund.

=== Other activities ===
In November 2008, Dmitriev published an essay entitled, "Crisis: five rules for survival", in the leading Russian business daily Vedomosti, the sister paper of the Financial Times and the Wall Street Journal, in which he warned that the 2008 financial crisis would be prolonged. In November 2012 he was appointed Deputy Chairman of the Investment Council under the Chairman of the State Duma. Serves as the Russian representative in the APEC Business Advisory Council. Dmitriev was Chairman of the B20s Investments and Infrastructure Taskforce during the 2013 Russian presidency of the G20. In 2014 Dmitriev was the Russian representative in the BRICS Business Council.

In January 2017, Dmitriev met with Erik Prince, the founder of the private military company Blackwater, George Nader, and the UAE Crown Prince Mohammed bin Zayed Al Nahyan (known as "MBZ") in the Seychelles. The meeting was convened by the UAE. Erik Prince was understood by the other participants to represent the presidential transition team of Donald Trump, while Dmitriev was understood to represent the Russian government. Prior to the meeting Nader had briefed Prince on Dmitriev and at the meeting Nader introduced Prince to Dmitriev as the person "designated by Steve [Bannon] to meet you! I know him and he is very very well connected and trusted by the New Team." (Note: In November 2017, Prince stated to the House Intelligence Committee that "I didn't fly there to meet any Russian guy," and repeatedly denied both that he neither had represented Trump or the transition team nor was acting as any back-channel between the transition team, the White House or Trump to the Kremlin or Putin. In 2018, both the Washington Post and ABC News reported that Prince's testimony was inaccurate. On 30 April 2019, House Intelligence Committee chairman Adam Schiff stated that he would send a criminal referral to the Justice Department alleging Prince had provided false testimony to the committee. United States Assistant Attorney General Stephen Boyd confirmed on 4 February 2020, that the Department of Justice was opening an investigation into Prince.) (Note: According to Karen Dawisha, Putin and his inner circle only use bearer shares for ownership. As of 2013, the Marshall Islands, Panama, Antigua, and Seychelles provide the greatest anonymity for the transfer of ownership with bearer shares.) Dmitriev also had contact to Jared Kushner during the first Trump presidency, and maintains contacts to the second Trump presidency in 2025, including Steve Witkoff.

In February 2019, Dmitriev was one of the first Russian executives and businessmen to personally speak in defence of Michael Calvey (the detained founder and head of the Baring Vostok Capital Partners) and other detained employees of the investment fund. Dmitriev appealed to Moscow City Court, Moscow's Basmanny District Court, and the Russian Investigative Committee, requesting to put detained Michael Calvey and other Baring Vostok employees to house arrest. Later on a court in Moscow released Calvey from pretrial detention and put him to house arrest.

=== Goldman Sachs and Russia ===
Kirill Dmitriev began his career in finance at Goldman Sachs in New York during the late 1990s, where he gained experience in Western investment banking. In 2011, Dmitriev was appointed CEO of the Russian Direct Investment Fund (RDIF), a sovereign wealth fund established to attract foreign investment into Russia. In February 2025, he was named Special Representative of the Russian President for Investment and Economic Cooperation, underscoring his role in navigating economic relations amid ongoing international sanctions.

During Donald Trump's presidency, Dmitriev was reported to have maintained informal contacts with members of the Trump administration. He notably met with U.S. real estate developer Steve Witkoff, a Trump associate, in discussions that were later dubbed the "Witkoff-Dmitriev pact" by some media outlets. These interactions earned Dmitriev the moniker "Putin’s Trump-whisperer" and highlighted his role as an intermediary in unofficial diplomatic channels.

Dmitriev was named in the report by U.S. Special Counsel Robert Mueller, who investigated the Russian interference in the 2016 United States presidential election. Mueller concluded that shortly before Donald Trump's inauguration in 2017, Dmitriev met with Trump associate Erik Prince in the Seychelles. According to The New York Times, in 2016 Dmitriev, leveraging his connections with Goldman Sachs, reached out through a Lebanese-American intermediary linked to the Trump campaign, seeking to establish contact with Trump's inner circle—preferably Donald Trump Jr. or Jared Kushner. By the end of that month, he connected with Rick Gerson, a close friend of Kushner and a hedge fund manager in New York. Their discussions reportedly included the prospect of a joint investment initiative.

In March 2025, as reported by Bloomberg, Goldman Sachs became the first major American financial institution to offer ruble-linked derivatives to investors since the imposition of Western sanctions in 2022. Around the same time, Russian President Vladimir Putin issued a decree allowing selected American investment funds to liquidate or transfer their holdings in Russian securities. Among them was the U.S.-based fund 683 Capital Partners LP, which received authorization to acquire Russian corporate assets previously owned by about a dozen Western firms, including Franklin Advisers Inc., Templeton Asset Management Ltd., and Baillie Gifford Overseas Ltd.

Goldman Sachs, where Dmitriev previously worked, has been scrutinized for its historical ties to multiple U.S. administrations, particularly during the Trump era, when several alumni—including Steven Mnuchin and Gary Cohn—held senior positions. Although there is no direct evidence linking the firm to lobbying efforts around Russia sanctions, analysts have noted that personal and professional networks may have played an indirect role in shaping policy perspectives.

=== Ukrainian ceasefire talks ===
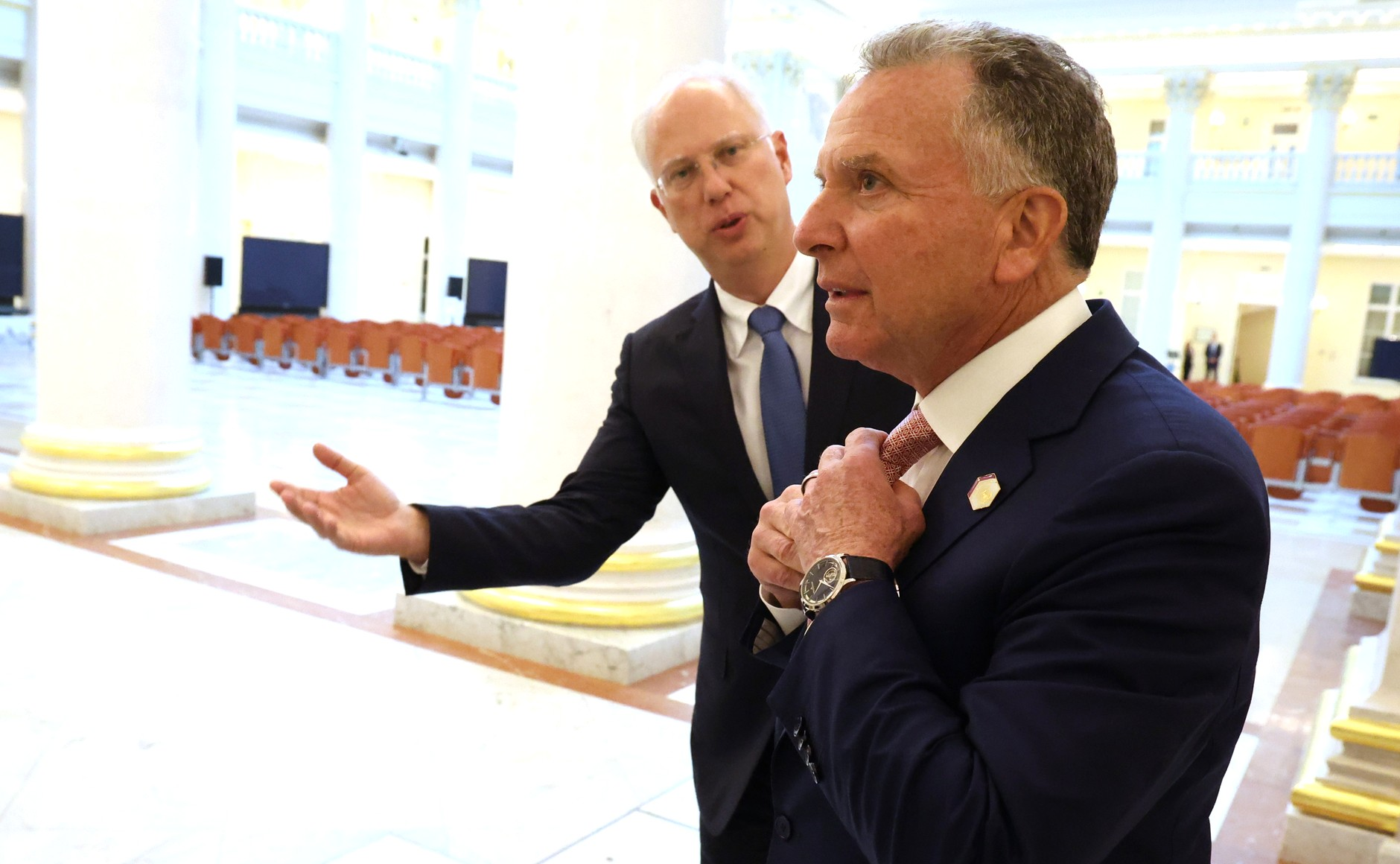
Dmitiev with Steve Witkoff during the latter's visit to St. Petersburg on 11 April 2025

It came to light after the initial meeting in February 2025 of the Ukrainian ceasefire talks between the Trump administration and the Russian side that Sergey Lavrov clashed visibly with Dmitriev, who had not been accredited through him by Putin, and Lavrov denied him a chair at the table. In early April 2025, Dmitriev took part in the negotiation process concerning the war in Ukraine and economic relations between the US and Russia, meeting with American envoy Steve Witkoff several times.

On 19 November 2025, Axios reported that Steve Witkoff had discussed a new 28-point U.S. peace plan with Dmitriev in Miami over three days 24 to 26 October. The plan is a wide framework encompassing security guarantees, security in Europe, and future Russia–U.S. relations, based on the principles discussed in the 2025 Russia–United States summit. On 8 October 2026, Reuters reported that Dmitriev had participated in discussions with Jared Kushner about involving a US investor in the Nord Stream pipeline project. The outlet also reported that Kushner and Dmitriev have met in New York and Moscow in recent weeks.

== Sanctions ==
Due to his support for Russian aggression and violation of the territorial integrity of Ukraine during the Russian-Ukrainian War, Dmitriev is under personal sanctions of a number of countries.

== Awards ==
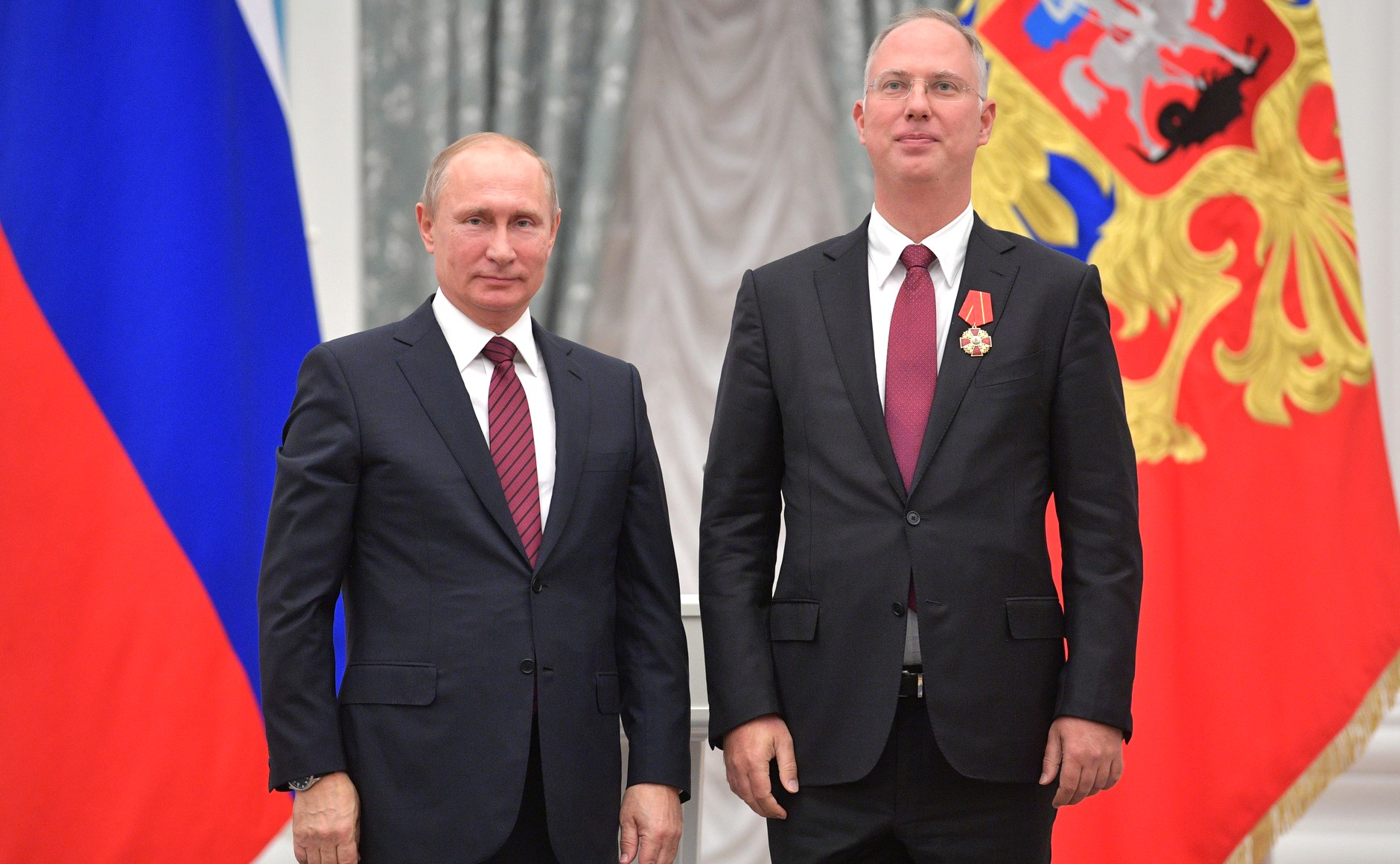
Presentation of the Order of Alexander Nevsky, 15 November 2017

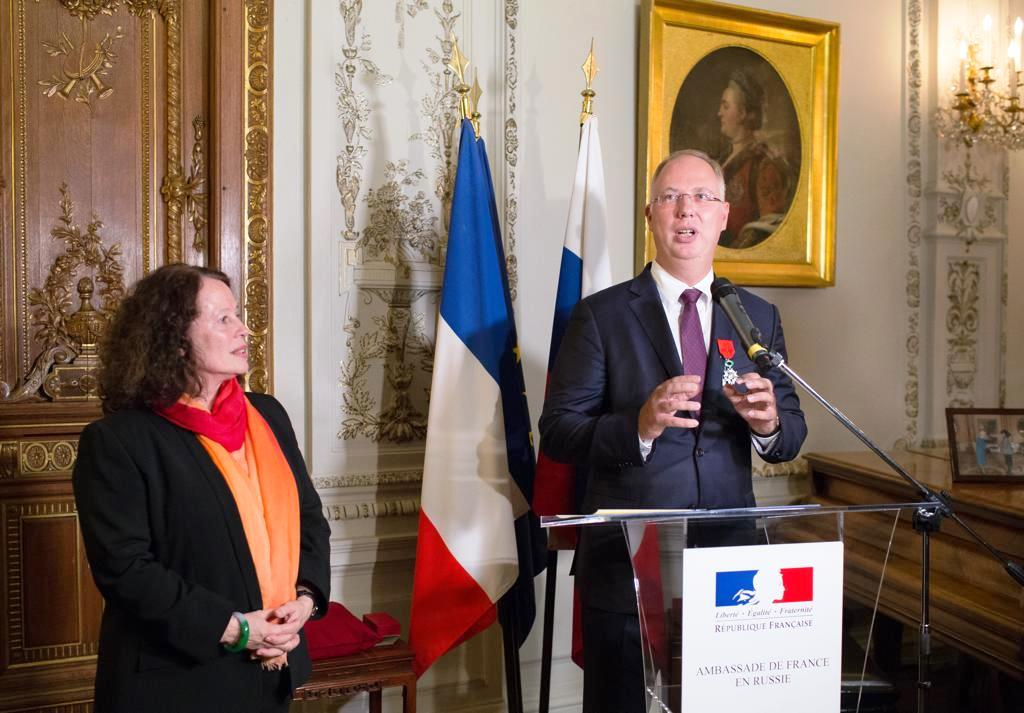
Speech at the French Embassy in Moscow after being awarded the Legion of Honour

Dmitriev has been awarded the Order of Alexander Nevsky (12 June 2017), the Order of Honour (16 April 2020), and Presidential Certificate of Honour (25 May 2015) by the Russian Federation. He was also awarded the Chevalier of the National Order of the Legion of Honour (19 November 2018) for his great contribution to strengthening cooperation between Russia and France, the King Abdulaziz Second-Class Order of Merit (5 October 2019) for his contribution to strengthening cooperation between the Russian Federation and Saudi Arabia, the Commander of the Order of the Star of Italy (14 May 2020) for his special achievements in the development of friendly relations and cooperation between Italy and Russia, and the Order of Friendship of Kazakhstan (20 December 2020) for special merits in the development of friendly relations and cooperation between Kazakhstan and Russia.

== Personal life ==
According to Ukrainian online newspaper Obozrevatel, Dmitriev has a Ukrainian passport that he last renewed in September 2005 in Kyiv. Dmitriev is married to Natalia Valerievna Popova (Russian: Наталья Валерьевна Попова). Popova is a deputy on the board of the NGO Innopraktika Foundation (Russian: «Иннопрактика»). Her close friend, Katerina Tikhonova, is the director of the NGO Innopraktika Foundation which was created "for an effective and flexible solution to the problems of the country's innovative development" (Russian: «для эффективного и гибкого решения задач инновационного развития страны») and the younger daughter of Vladimir Putin. The couples Shamalov-Tikhonova and Dmitriev-Popova were very close and went on holiday trips together before the divorce of Shamalov and Tikhonova which was announced in early 2018.

Dmitriev father Oleksandr Dmitriiev continued his career in Ukraine. In 2006 he was elected a corresponding member of the National Academy of Sciences of Ukraine (NASU). At the time of the 2022 Russian invasion of Ukraine, he worked at the Institute of Cell Biology and Genetic Engineering of the NASB of Ukraine, which is part of NASU. According to his employer Oleksandr Dmitriiev left Ukraine before the February 2022 Russian invasion and moved to Turkey. Oleksandr Dmitriiev was not fired and is on unpaid leave since 25 April 2022, this leave is extended every 90 days by mutual consent (according to his employer). In April 2025, his employer claimed that he, then aged 77, worked remotely for them and even writes scientific works. Dmitriev's father, mother and sister own an apartment in Kyiv's Pecherskyi District.

Dmitriev is a fervent user of social media platform X. His post have included accusations against "globalists" of indoctrinating children with "pro-trans programmes", comments about Europe's migration "crisis" and the promotion of conspiratorial rhetoric – once adding a QAnon-style slogan.
