= China–Eurasian Economic Cooperation Fund =

Chinese state-backed investment fund

The China-Eurasia Economic Cooperation Fund (中国-欧亚经济合作基金) (CEECF) is a Chinese state-backed investment fund created to invest in projects in Belt and Road Initiative countries. The fund was announced by General Secretary of the Chinese Communist Party Xi Jinping at the September 2014 Shanghai Cooperation Organisation (SCO) summit in Dushanbe and serves as a direct investment platform for the SCO region, with the Export-Import Bank of China as its majority shareholder.

In December 2015, CEECF entered into a cooperation agreement with the Russian Direct Investment Fund and Vnesheconombank in the presence of Chinese premier Li Keqiang and Russian prime minister Dmitry Medvedev during a state visit by Medvedev to Beijing.

== Investments ==
- (India) In September 2018, CEECF invested $50 million in Indian ride-hailing company Ola Consumer alongside Sailing Capital, valuing the company at $4.3 billion.
