= Alexander Gintsburg =

Russian microbiologist

- Александр Леонидович Гинцбург
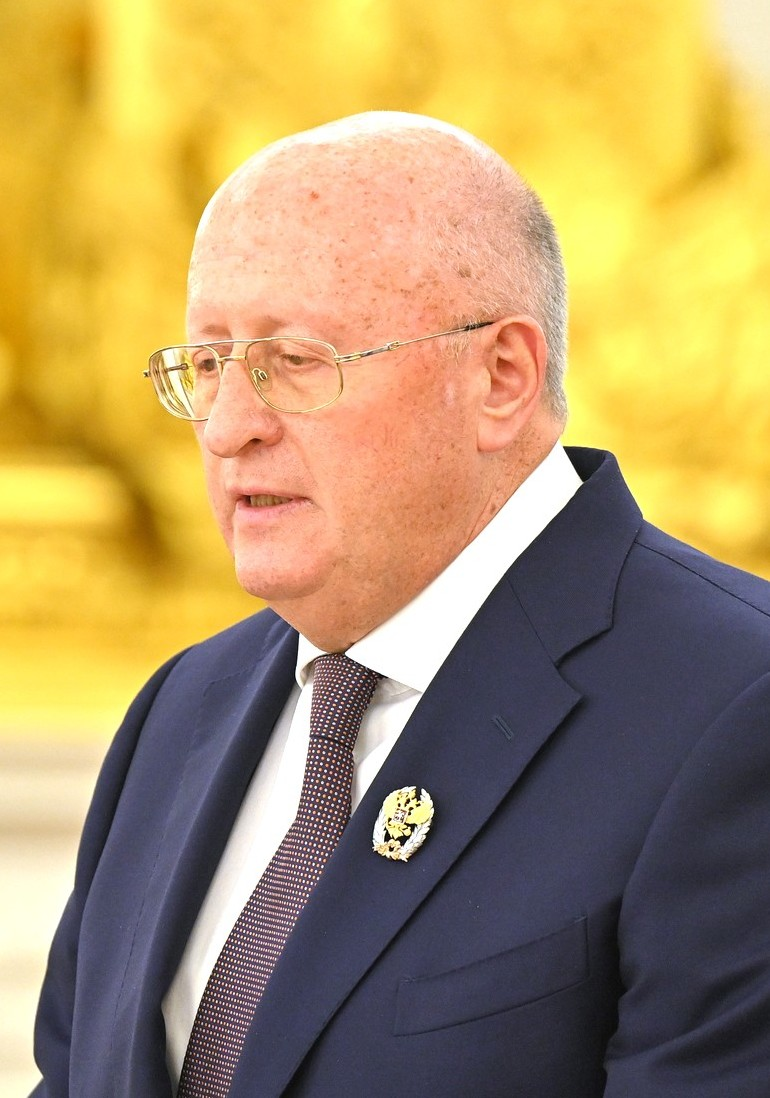
- Alexander Gintsburg in 2021
- Born: November 10, 1951
- Scientific career
- Fields: Microbiology

Alexander Leonidovich Gintsburg (Russian: Александр Леонидович Гинцбург; born 10 November 1951) is a Soviet and Russian microbiologist. Since 1997, he has been the director of the Gamaleya Research Institute of Epidemiology and Microbiology. He is Jewish.

In 2021 he was awarded the Fiddler on the Roof Award in the Science category.
