= Sputnik V COVID-19 vaccine =

Russian vaccine against COVID-19

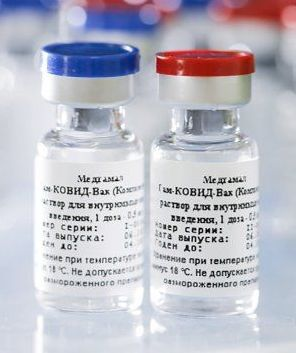
- Russian Ministry of Health image of Gam-COVID-Vac vials

Vaccine description
- Target: SARS-CoV-2
- Vaccine type: Viral vector

Clinical data
- Trade names: Sputnik V; Спутник V
- Other names: Gam-COVID-Vac; Гам-КОВИД-Вак
- License data: EU EMA: by INN
- Routes of administration: Intramuscular
- ATC code: J07BN02 (WHO)

Legal status
- Legal status: BR: Exceptional import; RU: Registered on 11 August 2020; Full list of Sputnik V vaccine authorizations

Identifiers
- CAS Number: 2541629-85-8
- DrugBank: DB15848

Sputnik V (Russian: Спутник V, the brand name from the Russian Direct Investment Fund or RDIF) or Gam-COVID-Vac (Russian: Гам-КОВИД-Вак, the name under which it is legally registered and produced) is an adenovirus viral vector vaccine for COVID-19 developed by the Gamaleya Research Institute of Epidemiology and Microbiology in Russia. It is the world's first registered combination vector vaccine for the prevention of COVID-19, having been registered on 11 August 2020 by the Russian Ministry of Health.

Gam-COVID-Vac was initially approved for distribution in Russia and then in 59 other countries (as of April 2021) on the preliminary results of Phase I–II studies eventually published on 4 September 2020. Approval in early August of Gam-COVID-Vac was met with criticism in mass media and discussions in the scientific community as to whether approval was justified in the absence of robust scientific research confirming safety and efficacy. A large-scale Brazilian study from Dec. 2020 to May 2021 confirmed its effectiveness and safety, as of Oxford–AstraZeneca's, i.e. above Sinopharm BIBP's.

Emergency mass-distribution of the vaccine began in December 2020 in countries including Russia, Argentina, Belarus, Hungary, Serbia, Pakistan (in limited quantities), the Philippines (in limited quantities), and the United Arab Emirates. As of 2021 the Sputnik V is registered and certified in 71 countries. However, as of April 2022 less than 2.5% of the people vaccinated worldwide have taken a Sputnik V dose. In early 2022, as a result of the 2022 Russian invasion of Ukraine, the United States and other countries placed the Russian Direct Investment Fund (RDIF) on the list of sanctioned Russian entities and people, significantly reducing Sputnik V's commercial prospects.

The Gam-COVID-Vac vaccine itself is available in two forms: frozen (vaccine storage: below −18 °C) and liquid (vaccine storage: from +2 to +8 °C, produced a little). In addition to the main vaccine, vaccines and its derivatives were registered: Gam-COVID-Vac-Lyo (Russian: Гам-КОВИД-Вак-Лио, freeze dried powder version), Sputnik Light (Russian: Спутник Лайт, used for revaccination, as well as vaccination of foreigners in Russia), Gam-COVID-Vac-M (Russian: Гам-КОВИД-Вак-М, for vaccination of adolescents 12–17 years old).

== Medical uses ==
The vaccine can be formulated in two ways: as a ready-to-use solution in water that is frozen at the common home-freezer storage temperature of −18 °C or 0 °F or lower, and as a freeze-dried (lyophilized) powder, "Gam-COVID-Vac-Lyo", which can be stored at 2–8 °C or 36–46 °F. The freeze-dried powder must be reconstituted with sterile water before use. The lyophilized formulation of Gam-COVID-Vac is similar to the smallpox vaccine, circumventing the need for continuous "colder chain" or cold-chain storage – as required for the Pfizer–BioNTech and Moderna vaccines – and allowing transportation to remote locations with reduced risk of vaccine spoilage.

The first dose (based on Ad26) is administered on the first day, and the second dose (based on Ad5) is administered on the 21st day to boost immune response. Both doses are administered into the deltoid muscle.

Sputnik Light is a registered single-dose vaccine consisting of only the first dose of Sputnik V. It is intended for areas with acute outbreaks and it will be used as a third (booster) dose for those who have received Sputnik V at least 6 months earlier. It can be stored at a normal refrigerator temperature of 2–8 °C (36–46 °F). The institute says this version would be ideally suited for areas with acute outbreaks, allowing more people to be vaccinated quickly.

Although Sputnik Light was not authorized by Ukraine or international organizations, tens of thousands of doses were shipped by Russia for use in non-government controlled parts of the eastern Donbas region from January 2021. Ukrainian officials criticized the move.

In January 2021, Sputnik Light commenced phase I/II trials. In February, Sputnik Light commenced phase III trials. Effectiveness is generally expected to slowly decrease over time.

A real-world study with participants aged 60–79 years in Argentina found that the single-injection vaccine is 79% (95% CI, 75–82%) effective in preventing infections, 88% (95% CI, 80–92%) effective against hospitalization, and 85% (95% CI, 75–91%) against death. A phase III clinical trial in Russia also found an efficacy of 79%. According to Nextstrain, lineage B.1.1.317 was the dominant variant in Russia during the study period (5 December 2020 to 15 April 2021), while in Argentina (29 December 2020 to 21 March 2021) lineage N.5 dominated at first, but soon many lineages coexisted in similar proportions.

Preliminary data from a study in Moscow in July 2021 indicate that the vaccine is 70% (95% CI, 64–75%) effective against symptomatic disease from the Delta variant for three months after vaccination. In August 2021, RDIF announced that preliminary results from a study on heterologous prime-boost vaccination indicate that it is safe to administer Sputnik Light as the first dose, then the Oxford–AstraZeneca, Moderna or Sinopharm BIBP vaccine as the second dose, as well as the homologous course consisting of Sputnik Light as the second dose.

On 11 August 2021, the developers of the Sputnik V vaccine offered its 'Sputnik Light' (Ad26) vaccine to Pfizer for trial against the Delta variant.

=== Effectiveness ===
The effectiveness of COVID-19 vaccines, or any other vaccine, is determined in a mass vaccination in a "real-world" setting (not in clinical trials). This is an assessment of how well the vaccine protects people from outcomes such as infection, symptomatic illness, hospitalization, and death. Effectiveness is evaluated outside of clinical trials, which by contrast, evaluate the efficacy of the vaccine. A vaccine is generally considered effective if the estimate is ≥50% with a >30% lower limit of the 95% confidence interval. Effectiveness is generally expected to slowly decrease over time.

On 25 August, a preliminary version of a case-control study indicated an unadjusted effectiveness of about 50% against symptomatic disease. The authors expected that adjusting for age and sex would increase the estimate, citing an increase from 66% to 81% when adjusting the data for effectiveness against hospitalization. (Note: Case-control study with 13,894 participants from 3 July 2021 to 9 August 2021 in Saint Petersburg. The study awaits peer review.)

A large-scale study in Buenos Aires from 29 December 2020, to 15 May 2021, with 663,602 participants aged 60 and older who received Spunik V, the Oxford–AstraZeneca vaccine, or the Sinopharm BIBP vaccine observed an overall efficacy of 98% (95% CI, 95–99%) against COVID-19-related deaths. The study noted that the three vaccines showed a similar effectiveness against death, and that the effectiveness against infection was similar to that of the Oxford-Astrazeneca vaccine and greater than that of the Sinopharm BIBP vaccine.

Initial effectiveness by variant
Doses	Severity of illness	Delta	Alpha
1	Symptomatic	Not reported	Not reported
1	Hospitalization	35% (−21 to 65%)	Not reported
2	Asymptomatic	Not reported	86% (84–87%) (Note: 22 January to 10 June 2021 in Hungary.)
2	Symptomatic	Not reported	Not reported
2	Hospitalization	81% (68–88%) (Note: 14 to 55 days after the second dose, higher in women, 84% (66–92%), than in men, 76% (51–88%). Increases to 85% (72–92%) 56 days or more after the second dose.)	Not reported
2	Death	Not reported	98% (96–99%)

A large-scale study was conducted in Mexico. The study compared 793,487 adults vaccinated with different vaccines with 4,792,338 unvaccinated adults between 24 December 2020, and 27 September 2021.The results were as follows:

Effectiveness of vaccines in Mexico (2021)
Vaccine	Incidental infection effectiveness	Hospitalization effectiveness	Mortality effectiveness
Spikevax	91.45%	78%	93.46%
Comirnaty	80.34%	84.26%	89.83%
Sputnik V	78.75%	81.38%	87.7%
Covishield	80.79%	80.23%	86.81%
Janssen	82.18%	77.33%	85.79%
CoronaVac	71.93%	73.76%	80.38%
Convidecia	70.5%	72.31%	79.93%

=== Efficacy ===
The vaccine efficacy of a COVID-19 vaccine or any other vaccine is evaluated in controlled clinical trials. It is an estimate of how many people who received the vaccine got the disease compared to how many people who got a placebo had the same outcome. On 2 February 2021, an interim analysis from the Moscow trial was published in The Lancet reporting an efficacy of 91.6% (95% CI, 85.6–95.2%) after the second dose for all age groups, with no unusual side effects. For the age group of 60 years and older, the reported efficacy was 91.8%. On 12 May, a group of biostatisticians from Russia, the US, France, Italy and the Netherlands questioned the efficacy results in a correspondence in The Lancet, highlighting "data discrepancies", "substandard reporting", "apparent errors and numerical inconsistencies" and an implausible homogeneity in vaccine efficacy across age groups.

The authors responded by saying that they had provided the regulatory authorities with all the data necessary for obtaining approval, and that the data included with the paper were enough for readers to confirm the reported vaccine efficacy. They also addressed the protocol queries, and said numerical inconsistencies were "simple typing errors that were formally corrected".

In June 2022 a group of biostatisticians from Australia and Singapore published a paper suggesting that the almost identical efficacy for every age group from the Lancet paper is highly unlikely to occur in genuine experimental data. The group called for a thorough investigation of the Lancet article, as well as the immediate release of anonymized individual patient data to an unbiased statistical expert, and suggested the article should be retracted. The Lancet Group recognised the concerns about the validity of data published in the article and invited the authors of the article to respond to these latest questions.

== Adverse effects ==
Side effects are mostly mild and similar to other adenovirus vector vaccines such as the Oxford-AstraZeneca and the Janssen vaccines. However, unlike the Oxford-AstraZeneca and Janssen vaccines evidence does not suggest a risk of vaccine-induced immune thrombotic thrombocytopenia. However, a report from Argentina published in the New England Journal of Medicine described fatal vaccine-induced thrombocytopenia and thrombosis in a young woman after receipt of Sputnik-V.

== Pharmacology ==
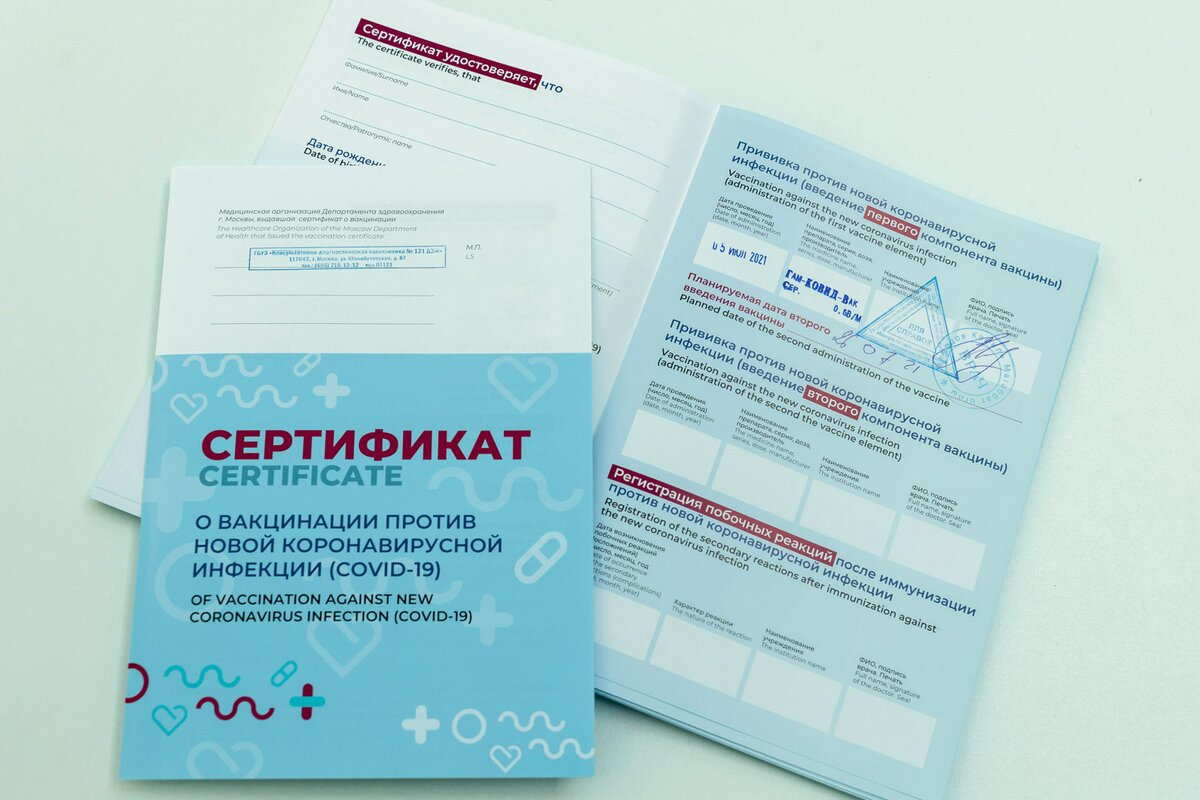
Sputnik V vaccination certificate issued in Moscow Gostiny Dvor vaccination point

Gam-COVID-Vac is a viral vector vaccine based on two recombinant replication-defective human adenoviruses: Ad26 (serotype 26) and Ad5 (serotype 5) replicated in HEK 293 cells. The viruses contain the gene that encodes the full-length spike protein (S) of SARS-CoV-2 to stimulate an immune response. Adenoviral vectors for expression of the SARS-CoV-2 spike protein have also been used in two other COVID-19 vaccines. One is the Janssen COVID-19 vaccine, which uses the Ad26COV2 viral vector based on the human virus Ad26. For this vaccine, the cell line PER.C6 is used to replicate the vector. Another one, the Oxford–AstraZeneca COVID‑19 vaccine, uses chimpanzee adenovirus (ChAdOx1) as the vector. For both the Oxford-AstraZeneca COVID-19 and Gam-COVID-Vac vaccines the producer cells for the production of non-replicating adenoviral vectors were obtained from the HEK 293 cell line. Each dose of Gam-COVID-Vac contains (1.0 ± 0.5) × 10^{11} virus particles.

Both Ad26 and Ad5 were modified to remove the E1 gene to prevent replication outside the HEK 293 cells. For the production of the vaccine, to propagate adenoviral vectors in which the E1 gene was deleted, HEK 293 cells are used, which express several adenoviral genes, including E1. However, although rare, homologous recombination between the inserted cellular sequence and the vector sequence can restore the replication capacity to the vector, with less than 100 replicating adenovirus particles per dose of the vaccine.

== Chemistry ==
The other ingredients (excipients) are the same, both quantitatively and qualitatively, in the two doses.

- Tris(hydroxymethyl)aminomethane (buffer)
- Sodium chloride (salt)
- Sucrose (sugar)
- Magnesium chloride hexahydrate
- Disodium EDTA dihydrate (a chelation ligand; sequestrant)
- Polysorbate 80
- Ethanol 95%
- Water

No adjuvants and no other components or ingredients should be included in the vaccine.

== Manufacturing ==
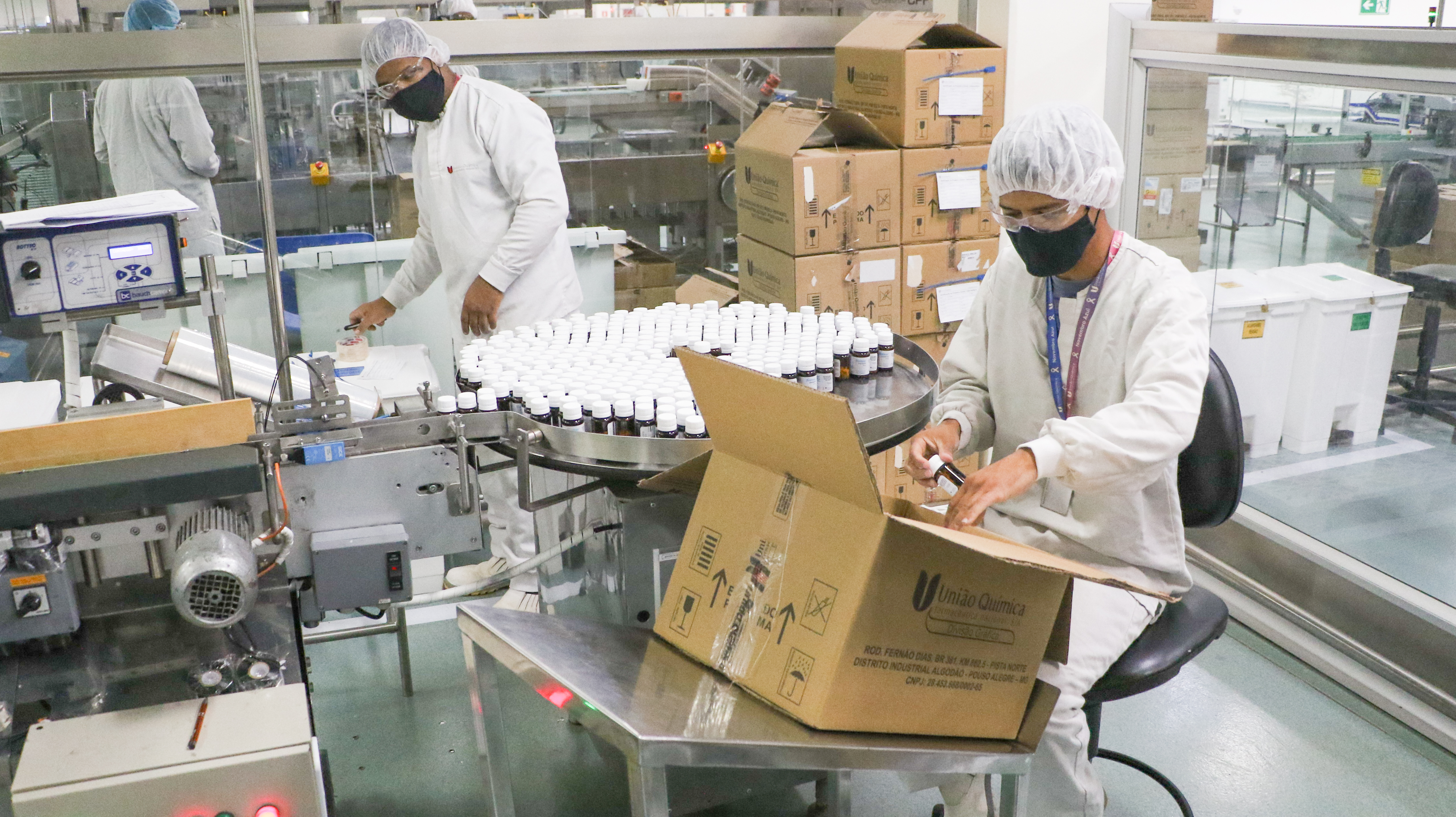
Pharmaceutical company União Quimica started production of Sputnik V in Brazil in January 2021.

Large quantities of both adenoviruses are produced by HEK 293 cells that have the E1 gene necessary for viral replication. Rarely, Ad5 can acquire the E1 gene from the HEK 293 cells, restoring its ability to replicate. Gamaleya has set an acceptable limit of 5,000 replicating virus particles per vaccine dose, and quality control documents state that tested batches contain less than 100 replicating virus particles per dose.

The production of the frozen liquid formulation was developed for large-scale use, it is cheaper and easier to manufacture. The production of the freeze-dried formulation takes much more time and resources, although it is more convenient for storage and transportation. It was developed with vaccine delivery to hard-to-reach regions of Russia in mind.

According to Russian media, the mass production of the Gam-COVID-Vac was launched by 15 August. By that moment, the Russian Federation has already received applications from 20 countries for the supply of 1 billion doses of vaccine. Three facilities were able to produce about a million doses per month at each with a potential doubling of capacity by winter. By the end of 2020, Gamaleya Research Institute's production, according to an interview with the organization's spokesperson, was planned to produce 3–5 million doses.

As of March 2021, the Russian Direct Investment Fund (RDIF) has licensed production in India, China, South Korea and Brazil. In the EU, RDIF has signed production agreements. By the end of March 2021 RDIF anticipates 33 million doses will have been manufactured in Russia, less than 5% of which will have been exported.

An agreement for the production of over 100 million doses of vaccine in India was made with Dr. Reddy's Laboratories, which on 11 January 2021 submitted mid-stage trial data to the Indian regulator and recommended moving onto late-stage trials. The RDIF announced plans to sell 100 million doses to India, 35 million to Uzbekistan, and 32 million to Mexico, as well as 25 million each to Nepal and Egypt. In India, the first dose of Sputnik V vaccine was administered on 14 May 2021 at Hyderabad. Argentina became the first Latin American country to produce it. Large-scale production started in June 2021. As of 31 December 2021 277 million doses were manufactured, mostly (265 million) in Russia.

On 28 February 2022, as a result of the 2022 Russian invasion of Ukraine, the United States placed RDIF and its chief executive on its list of sanctioned Russian entities and people. The European Union, Ukraine, United Kingdom and Australia followed later in February and in March. This significantly reduces vaccine's future commercial prospects.

== History ==
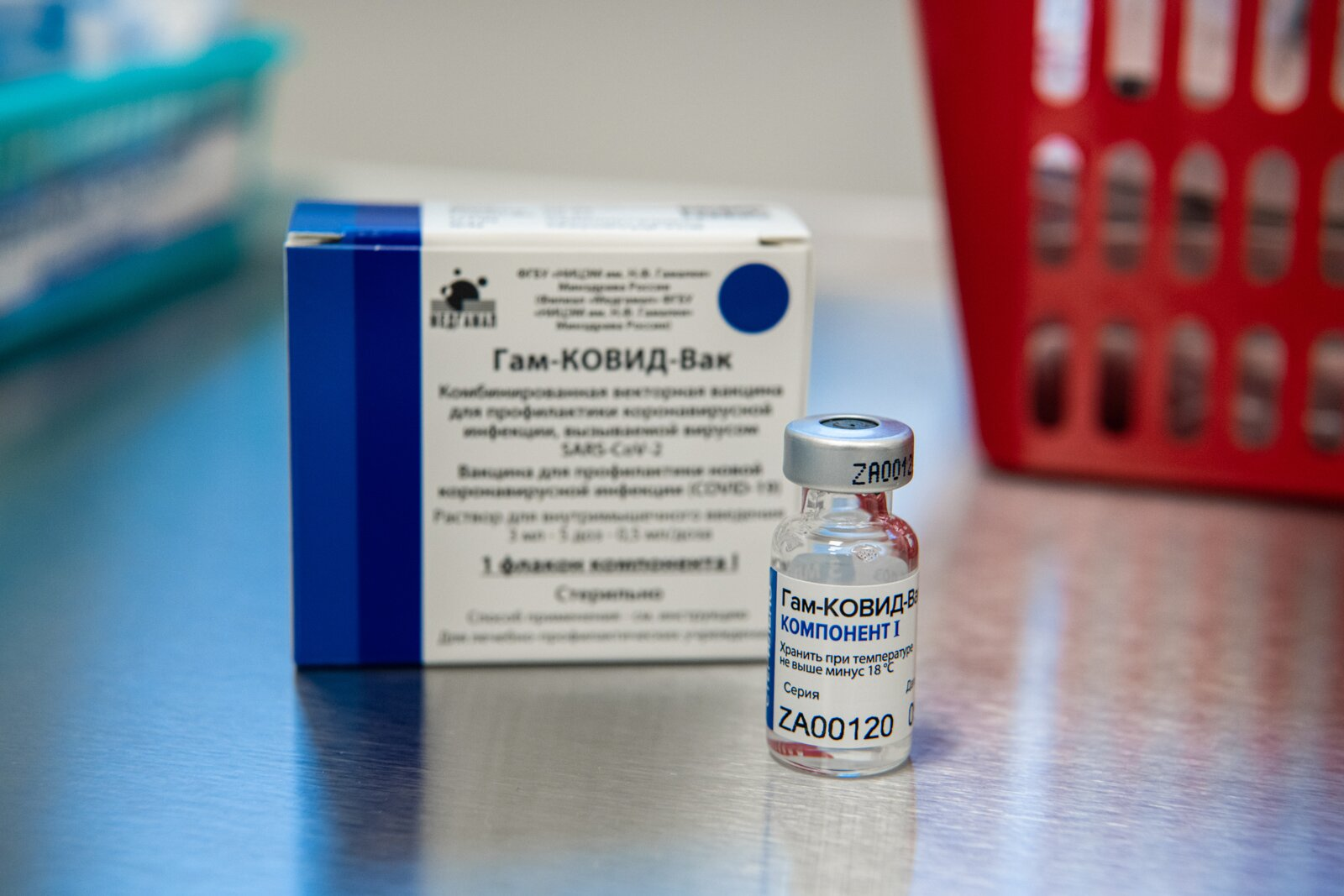
Package and Vial for the first dose

The Gam-COVID-Vac vaccine was developed by a cellular microbiologists team of the government-backed Gamaleya Research Institute of Epidemiology and Microbiology. The group was led by MD and RAS associate member Denis Logunov, who also worked on vaccines for the Ebolavirus and the MERS-coronavirus.

In May 2020, the Gamaleya Research Institute of Epidemiology and Microbiology announced that it had developed the vaccine without serious side effects. By August 2020, phases I and II of two clinical trials (involving 38 patients each) were completed. Only one of them used the formulation which later obtained marketing authorization under limited conditions. This vaccine was given the trade name "Sputnik V", after the world's first artificial satellite.

During preclinical and clinical trials, 38 participants who received one or two doses of the Gam-COVID-Vac vaccine had produced antibodies against SARS-CoV-2's spike protein, including potent neutralizing antibodies that inactivate viral particles. On 11 August 2020, the Russian minister of Health Mikhail Murashko announced at a government briefing with the participation of President Vladimir Putin regulatory approval of the vaccine for widespread use. The state registration of the vaccine was carried out "conditionally" with post-marketing measures according to the decree of the Government of the Russian Federation. The registration certificate for the vaccine stated that it could not be used widely in Russia until 1 January 2021, and before that, it may be provided to "a small number of citizens from vulnerable groups", such as medical staff and the elderly, according to a Ministry of Health spokesperson. The license under register number No. ЛП-006395 (LP-006395) was issued on 11 August by the Russian Ministry of Health. Although the announcement was made even before the vaccine candidate had been entered into Phase III trials, the practice of marketing authorization "on conditions" also exists in other countries. On 26 August, certificate No. ЛП-006423 (LP-006423) was issued for the lyophilized formulation "Gam-COVID-Vac-Lyo".

On 12 June 2021, developers announced that they had developed and tested a nasal vaccine for children aged 8 to 12, with no side effects found, and that they expected to release it on 15 September 2021.

=== Clinical trials ===
==== Phase I–II ====
A phase I safety trial began on 18 June 2020. On 4 September 2020, data on 76 participants in a phase I–II trial were published, indicating preliminary evidence of safety and an immune response. The results were challenged by international vaccine scientists as being incomplete, suspicious, and unreliable when identical data were reported for many of the trial participants, but the authors responded that there was a small sample size of nine, and the measured results of titration could only take discrete values (800, 1600, 3200, 6400). Coupled with the observation that values tended to reach a plateau after three to four weeks, they contend that it is not unlikely that several participants would show identical results for days 21 to 28.

==== Phase III ====
Sputnik V, efficacy for different conditions. The error bars indicate the confidence interval containing the efficacy with 95% probability.

In early November 2020, Israel Hadassah Medical Center director-general Zeev Rotstein stated that Hadassah's branch in Moscow's Skolkovo Innovation Center was collaborating on a phase III clinical trial.

The ongoing phase III study is a randomised, double-blind, placebo-controlled, multi-centre clinical trial involving 40,000 volunteers in Moscow, and is scheduled to run until May 2021. In 2020–2021, phase III clinical studies were also being conducted in Belarus, UAE, India, Kazakhstan and Venezuela.

On 13 April 2021, India's health ministry said its drug regulator had found that safety and immunogenicity data from a local trial of Sputnik V coronavirus vaccine was comparable to that of a late-stage trial done in Russia.

==== Variants ====
In May 2021, a study by researchers of the National University of Córdoba, Argentina, found that the vaccine produced antibodies capable of neutralizing the Gamma variant.

A study in Argentina found that neutralization is maintained against Alpha and Lambda and reduced against Gamma. The degree of reduction, however, does not necessarily imply reduced protection.

A small study of 12 serum samples found that antibodies from the vaccine effectively neutralize the Alpha variant, with moderately reduced neutralization against the E484K substitution (median 2.8 fold reduction). However, neutralization of the Beta variant was markedly reduced (median 6.1 fold reduction).

=== Authorizations ===
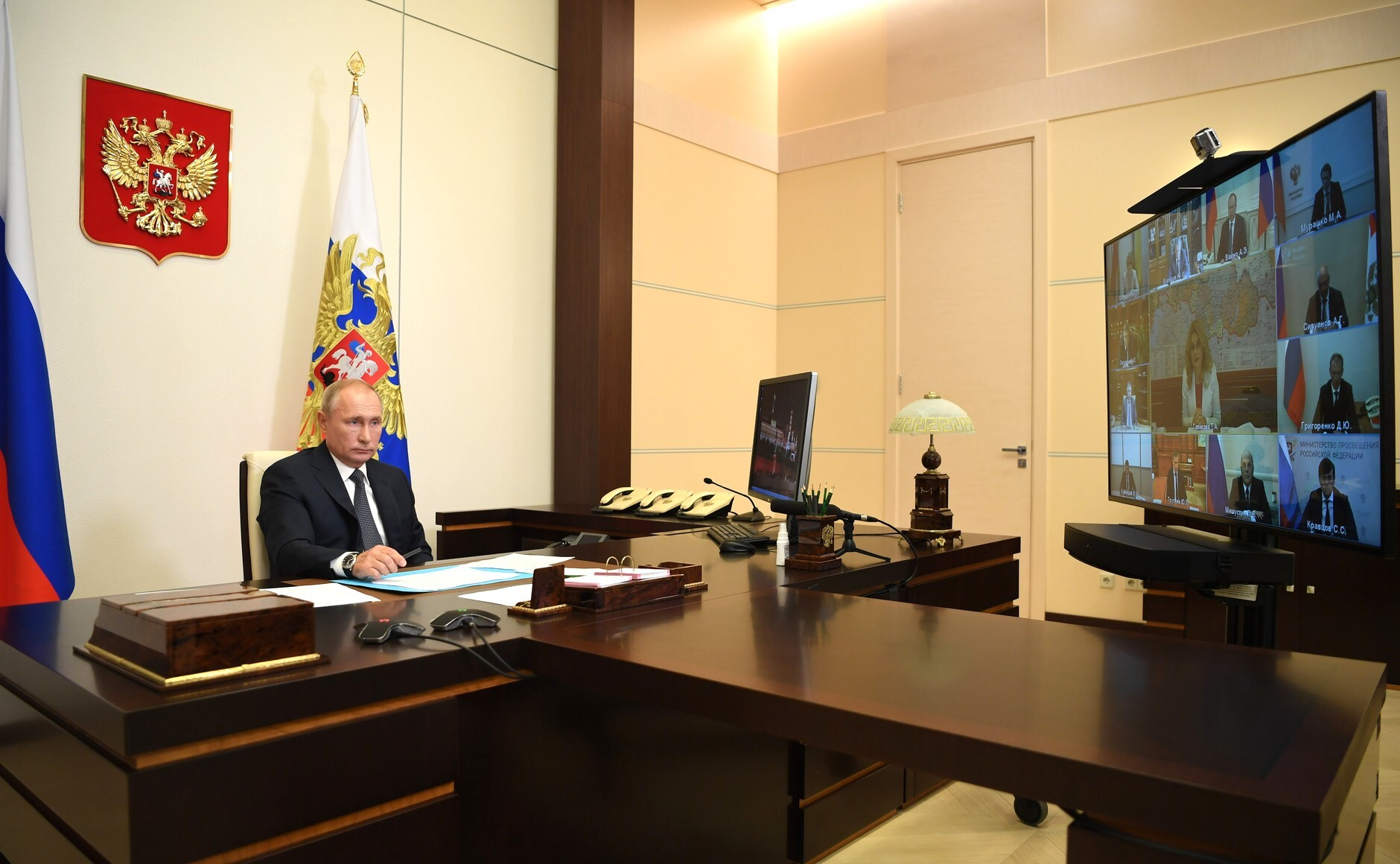
President Putin's meeting with government members, on 11 August 2020 via videoconference, at which he announced a conditionally registered vaccine against COVID-19

In August 2020, British and American officials stated that the Gam-COVID-Vac vaccine would likely be rejected due to concerns that the normally rigorous process of vaccine clinical testing was not followed.

As of December 2020, Belarus and Argentina granted emergency use authorization for the vector-based vaccine. On 21 January 2021, Hungary became the first European Union country to register the shot for emergency use, as well as the United Arab Emirates in the Persian Gulf region.

On 19 January 2021, the Russian authorities applied for the registration of Sputnik V in the European Union, according to the RDIF. On 10 February, the European Medicines Agency (EMA) said that they had "not received an application for a rolling review or a marketing authorisation for the vaccine". The developers have only expressed their interest that the vaccine be considered for a rolling review, but EMA's Human Medicines Committee (CHMP) and the COVID-19 EMA pandemic Task Force (COVID-ETF) need to give their agreement first before developers can submit their application for initiation of the rolling review process. On 4 March 2021, the Committee for Medicinal Products for Human Use (CHMP) of the EMA started a rolling review of Sputnik V. The EU applicant is R-Pharm Germany GmbH, a subsidiary of the Russian R-Pharm. On 16 June, Reuters reported that approval of Sputnik V will be delayed at least until September because not all the necessary clinical data has been submitted by the deadline. As of June 2021, Sputnik V is under rolling review process by EMA, but the marketing authorisation application was not submitted yet.

Emergency use has also been authorized in Algeria, Bolivia, Serbia, the Palestinian territories, and Mexico.

On 25 January 2021, Iran approved the vaccine, with Foreign Minister Mohammad Javad Zarif saying the country hopes to begin purchases and start joint production of the shot "in the near future", after Supreme Leader Ayatollah Ali Khamenei banned the government from importing vaccines from the United States and United Kingdom.

The Czech Republic was also considering buying Sputnik V, and Prime Minister Andrej Babis dismissed the Minister of Health, Jan Blatný, who was a loud opponent to the use of Sputnik V.

On 4 March 2021, EMA's human medicines committee (CHMP) has started a rolling review of Sputnik V (Gam-COVID-Vac), a COVID-19 vaccine developed by Russia's Gamaleya National Centre of Epidemiology and Microbiology. When asked about the prospect of Austria giving Sputnik V the approval (as some other European countries chose to do), EMA management board chair Christa Wirthumer-Hoche pointed to the fact there was not yet sufficient safety data about those who had already been given the vaccine. "We could have Sputnik V on the market in future, when we've examined the necessary data," she said, adding that the vaccine needed to match up to European criteria on quality control and efficacy.

On 18 March 2021, German regional leaders including State Premiers and the mayor of Berlin called for the swift approval of the Russian vaccine by the European Medicines Agency to counteract the acute shortages of effective vaccines in Europe. German medical experts have recommended its approval also, and consider the Sputnik Vaccine "clever" and "highly safe".

On 19 March 2021, the Philippine Food and Drug Administration granted emergency use authorization for Sputnik V, the fourth COVID-19 vaccine to be given authorization. The Philippine government planned to buy 20 million doses of the vaccine.

On 12 April 2021, India approved the use of Sputnik V vaccine for emergency use against COVID-19 based on strong immunogenicity data.

As of 12 April 2021, 62 countries had granted Sputnik V emergency use authorization.

On 27 April 2021, Bangladesh approved the use of Sputnik V vaccine for emergency use.

On 30 April 2021, Turkey and Albania approved the use of Sputnik V vaccine for emergency use.

==== Slovakia ====
On 1 March 2021, Slovakia bought 2 million doses of the Sputnik V vaccine. Slovakia received the first batch of 200,000, and expected to receive another 800,000 doses in March and April. Another 1 million doses were set to arrive in May and June.

On 8 April, Slovakia's drug regulator said that the Sputnik V vaccine it received did "not have the same characteristics and properties" as the version endorsed by The Lancet. The Slovak State Institute for Drug Control stated that Sputnik V has not yet been approved for use, as the first 200,000 doses received on 31 March were different from the product currently being reviewed by the European Medicines Agency as well as from the vaccine used in studies published in The Lancet. The producers have failed to reply to requests for documentation, and approximately 80% of the data was not supplied even after repeated requests. Due to the inconsistencies, it was not possible to review the safety and efficacy of the vaccine. The Russian Direct Investment Fund replied that the Slovak laboratory which tested the vaccine was not certified by the EMA.

Slovak Prime Minister Igor Matovič resigned on 30 March, due to the political crisis started by the order of the Sputnik V vaccine. On 6 April 2021, the RDIF asked to return the delivered first batch of the vaccine due to "multiple contract violations".

On 29 April 2021, the Slovak Ministry of Health published the Sputnik V contract. According to the contract, the RDIF as a seller is not liable for any adverse events following administering of the vaccine, nor its effectiveness. According to the Slovak lawyers, the contract is explicitly disadvantageous for Slovakia.

On 8 May 2021, the Russian Direct Investment Fund sent a letter to the Denník N newspaper requesting the removal of the statements of the drug regulator, calling them "unsubstantiated and false" and "fake news". RDIF threatened the newspaper with legal action if they didn't comply with the demand by 9 May. The newspaper's editors refused.

After the samples were sent to the EU-certified laboratory in Hungary and it was stated that "the results were satisfactory", the Slovak government approved the vaccine, and announced that vaccination with Sputnik V would begin in June 2021, despite the negative review by Slovakia's drug regulator. Vaccinations started on 7 June, but without significant interest in the Sputnik V vaccine. Slovakia had no plans to order new batches and planned to sell or donate unused vaccines to Balkans countries. The registrations for vaccination were closed on 30 June. In July 2021, 160,000 doses of the vaccine from the first batch of 200,000 were shipped back to Russia. Temporary government approval for Sputnik V expired on 31 August 2021. In total, 18,500 people have been vaccinated.

The purchase of Sputnik V, which led to a political crisis and contributed to a fall of Igor Matovič's Cabinet was investigated by Slovak Police Force with the investigation levered against Marek Krajčí. No violation of the law was found in October 2022.

==== Brazil ====
On 26 April 2021, the Brazilian health regulator Anvisa rejected the use of Sputnik V, alleging a lack of consistent and reliable data and the presence of replicating adenovirus in the vaccine. RDIF and Sputnik V's official Twitter account said the decision may be politically motivated, pointing to a report by the United States government stating that the Office of Global Affairs persuaded Brazil to reject the vaccine. Several Brazilian states in the North and Northeast regions had already signed contracts for the acquisition of more than 30 million doses. Anvisa attributed its decision to a number of issues with the samples provided by Gamaleya for accreditation:

- the adenovirus carrier in all samples was actually able to replicate in spite of manufacturer's declaration it was incapacitated
- the methodology used by Gamaleya to check immune system response was unreliable and documentation provided made its verification impossible
- the procedure of registering adverse effects was insufficient
- Anvisa delegation was also not allowed into the Gamaleya laboratory for inspection
- all presented studies were performed on vaccine doses produced in laboratory, rather than in the manufacturing facility supplying vaccine for the mass market, which makes the results not representative
- Anvisa found issues in one of the factories in Russia that could impact sterility of the doses.

On 29 April 2021, the developers of Sputnik V said that Anvisa admitted not testing Sputnik V and that they would sue Anvisa in Brazil for defamation. At a press conference, Anvisa officials said that Gamaleya's own documents indicated multiple times the presence of replication-competent adenoviruses (RCAs) in ready vaccine batches and that the specifications accepted a level of RCAs 300 times greater than any other regulatory threshold. Anvisa presented the video of a meeting with representatives from Russia and Brazil where, when asked about the presence of RCAs, a representative from Russia reported problems with the cells and said that the vaccine could have been redeveloped, but it would take too long, so the developers instead chose to continue the research imposing an acceptable level of RCAs. Virologist Angela Rasmussen described this problem as a quality control issue that is unimportant for healthy people because adenoviruses are not significant pathogens, but added that it could produce serious adverse effects in immunocompromised individuals. Medicinal chemist Derek Lowe commented that the presence of replicating adenoviruses is unlikely to cause any major problems, but it is a "completely unnecessary risk", that it certainly will harm some people, and that providing a product different from the one described in studies undermines the credibility of all manufacturing and quality control processes, adding that some posts on the official Sputnik V Twitter account constitute "aggressive political marketing" and some make invalid claims regarding the performance of competing vaccines, such as the Pfizer-BioNTech vaccine. Anvisa said that the import ban can be reversed if Gamaleya clarifies the issues. Adenovirus infections cause only mild colds in healthy individuals, but they can cause life-threatening illnesses in immunodeficient individuals. The director of the Public Health Institute of Chile (ISP), Heriberto Garcia, said that the ISP would not necessarily reject the vaccine, even if it had replicating adenoviruses, because the risk of getting a common cold from the vaccine must be weighed against the risk of contracting COVID-19 when not vaccinated. He also said that real-world data from Argentina and Mexico showed no adverse effects greater than those seen in people vaccinated with the Pfizer-BioNTech vaccine or CoronaVac.

On 4 June, Anvisa approved exceptional imports of Sputnik V, restricting it mainly to healthy adults and limiting it to only 1% of the population of 6 importing states, in order to manage risks through control and supervision of side effects. Anvisa said that the concern with replicating viruses has not been fully resolved, but that additional documents received indicate a substantially reduced acceptable amount. The new parameter would be in an FDA manual, which was not found. Anvisa also said that impurity and quality controls are insufficient and that the manufacturing plants must undergo corrections to meet WHO quality standards. As of 16 June, the same import conditions were extended to a total of 13 states. On 5 August, the consortium of northeastern Brazilian states, corresponding to 7 of the 13 states, suspended the import of 37 million doses due to the restrictions imposed by Anvisa. These doses will supply Mexico, Argentina and Bolivia.

=== Further development ===
==== Heterologous prime-boost vaccination ====
On 21 December 2020 the Russian Direct Investment Fund (RDIF), the Gamaleya National Center, AstraZeneca and R-Pharm signed an agreement aimed at the development and implementation of a clinical research program to assess the immunogenicity and safety of the combined use of one of the components of the Sputnik V vaccine developed by the Gamaleya Center, and one of the components of the Oxford–AstraZeneca vaccine. The study program will last 6 months in several countries, and it is planned to involve 100 volunteers in each study program. On 9 February 2021, the Ministry of Health of the Republic of Azerbaijan allowed clinical studies in the country for the combined use of the Oxford–AstraZeneca vaccine and Sputnik Light, stating that the trials would begin before the end of February 2021. On 20 February 2021, in the official Sputnik V Twitter account it was stated that clinical trials have already started.

== Society and culture ==
=== Economics ===
==== In Russia ====
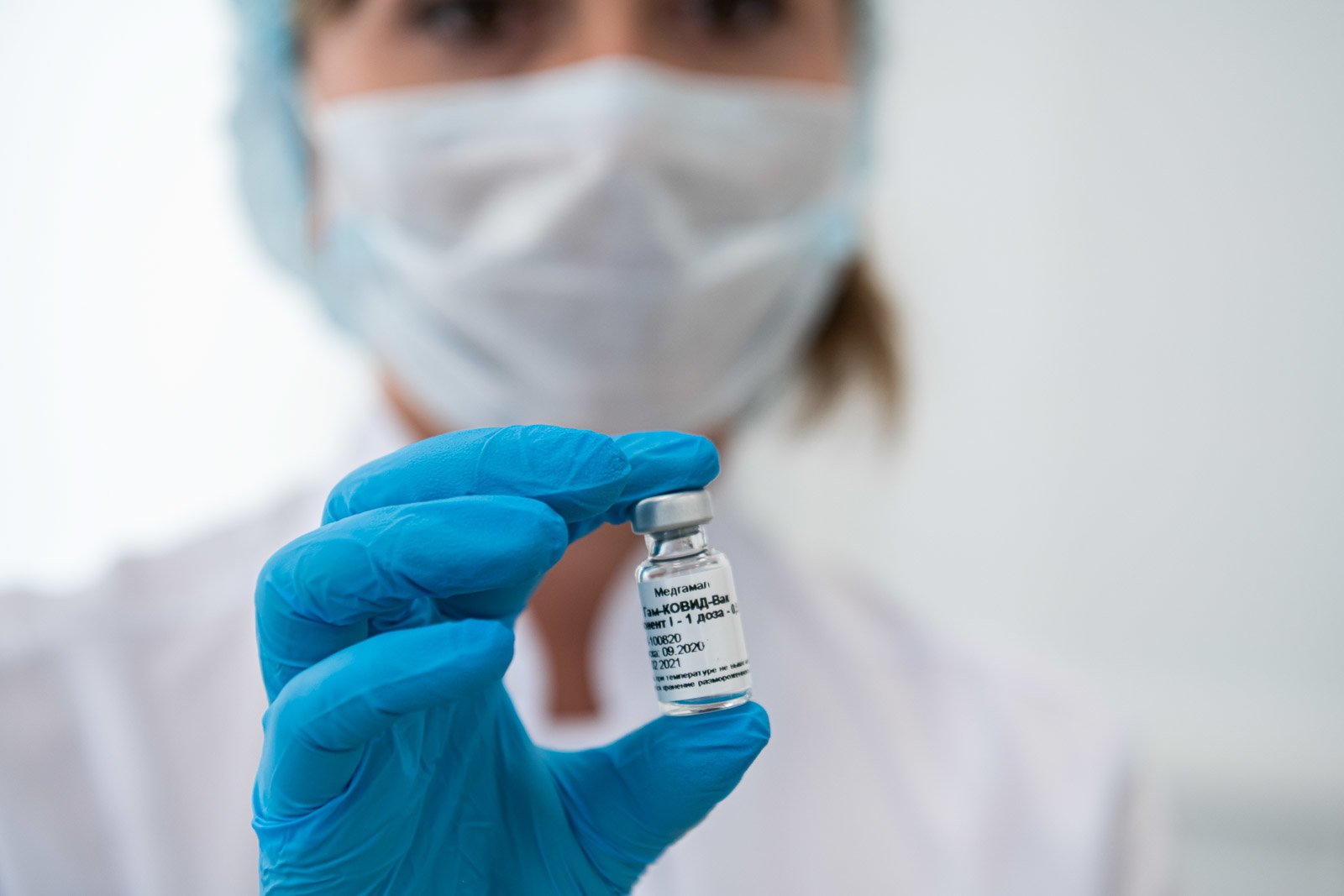
Medical worker in Moscow with the vaccine

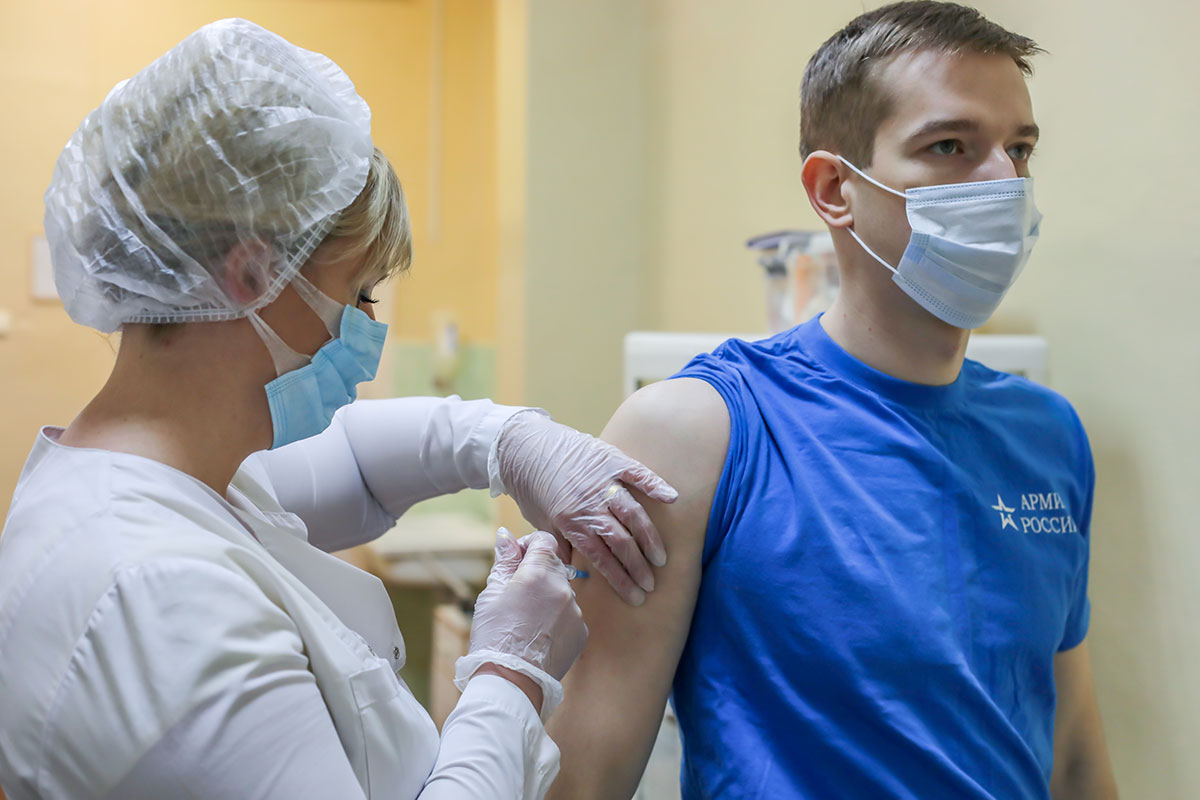
Vaccination of military personnel and civilian specialists of the Northern Fleet with the second component of the drug "Gam-COVID-Vac" ("Sputnik V")

The vaccine is free of charge to users in Russia and Kazakhstan. The cost per dose would be less than US$10 (US$20 for the required two doses) on international markets, much less than the cost of mRNA vaccines from other manufacturers. Kirill Dmitriev, head of the fund, told reporters that over 1 billion doses of the vaccine are expected to be produced in 2021 outside of Russia.

The head of the Gamaleya Research Institute Alexander Ginzburg estimated that it would take 9–12 months to vaccinate the vast majority of the Russian population, assuming in-country resources were adequate.

The commercial release of the Gam-COVID-Vac was first scheduled for September 2020. In October, Mikhail Murashko said that the Gam-COVID-Vac would be free for all Russian citizens after the launching of mass production. Later on, the Russian Ministry of Health registered the maximum ex-factory price equal to 1,942 rubles for two components and included it into The National List of Essential medicines. There were also suggestions to include the vaccine in the National Immunisation Calendar of Russia.

In the beginning of December 2020, Russian authorities announced the start of a large-scale free of charge vaccination with Gam-COVID-Vac for Russian citizens: the immunization program was launched on 5 December 2020 (with 70 medical centres in Moscow providing vaccinations).

Doctors and other medical workers, teachers, and social workers were given priority due to their highest risk of exposure to the disease. Initially the vaccine was only offered to people over 60 years of age, later this restriction was lifted.

Potential recipients were notified via text messaging, which said "You are working at an educational institution and have top-priority for the COVID-19 vaccine, free of charge". Patients were asked a few general health questions before receiving the vaccine. People with certain underlying health conditions, pregnant women, and those who have had a respiratory illness for the past two weeks were barred from vaccination. The vaccine vial was removed from medical centre's freezer about 15 minutes before use.

In early December 2020, the Minister of Health, Mikhail Murashko, said that Russia had already vaccinated more than 100,000 high-risk people. Forty thousand of those were volunteers in Sputnik V's Phase 3 trials, another 60,000 nurses and doctors had also taken the vaccine. The head of the Russian Direct Investment Fund, Kirill Dmitriev, said in an interview with the BBC that Russian medics expected to give about 2 million people coronavirus vaccinations in December 2020.

Up to the beginning of December 2020, Generium (which is supervised by Pharmstandard) and Binnopharm (which is supervised by AFK Sistema) companies produced Gam-COVID-Vac on a large scale.

On 10 December, Deputy Prime Minister Tatyana Golikova announced that approximately 6.9 million doses of the Sputnik V vaccine would enter civilian circulation in Russia before the end of February 2021. Moscow Mayor Sergei Sobyanin announced that the newly opened Moscow-based "R-Pharm" will become a leading manufacturer of Russia's Sputnik V coronavirus vaccine. Working at full capacity, the factory will produce up to 10 million doses a month.

In May 2021 Sergei Sobyanin complained that only 1.3 million Moscow residents out of 12 million had received the first dose (10.2%). Only 9.5% of Russians had received a vaccine. Forbes Russia established that Russia committed to export 205 millions of doses of "Sputnik V" to other countries, and as of 16 May.3 millions (8%) were so far delivered. A survey found that 62% of the Russian population felt hesitant, with 55% not afraid of getting sick and some willing to wait for CoviVac.

In June 2021, with the increase in Delta variant cases, several Russian city governments introduced strict measures to overcome vaccine hesitancy, such as requiring vaccine QR codes from customers in cafes.

==== Outside of Russia ====
In dark green are the countries that approved Sputnik V vaccine against COVID-19. In light green are the countries that have shown interest in obtaining the vaccine. Light blue indicates current or future producers and dark blue the country origin of vaccine design (Russia).

Russia is pursuing deals to supply its vaccine abroad.

According to the Russian Direct Investment Fund, they had received orders for more than 1.2 billion doses of the vaccine as of December 2020. Over 50 countries had made requests for doses, with supplies for the global market being produced by partners in India, Brazil, China, South Korea, Hungary, and other countries. In August 2020, according to the Russian authorities, there were at least 20 countries that wanted to obtain the vaccine.

The Israeli Hadassah Medical Center signed a commercial memorandum of understanding to obtain 1.5–3 million doses.

Argentina agreed to buy 25 million doses of Russia's COVID-19 vaccine, subject to its clearing clinical trials; the vaccine was registered and approved in Argentina in late December 2020. The Brazilian state of Bahia signed an agreement to conduct Phase III clinical trials of the Sputnik V vaccine and planned to buy 50 million doses to market in northeastern Brazil.

On 21 January 2021, Argentine president Alberto Fernández became the first Latin American leader to be inoculated with Sputnik V, shortly after it was approved for use in the country. Two months after being vaccinated he developed fever and headache, and tested positive for COVID-19. He was asymptomatic ten days later, was discharged from medical treatment subject to medical follow-up as usual for former COVID-19 patients, and resumed his normal activities.

According to The New York Times sources, in February 2021, Israel agreed to finance a supply of the Sputnik V vaccine to Syria in order to secure the release of an Israeli civilian held in Syria.

Due to the delay in shipping of doses from Italy and the European Union, San Marino imported doses of the Sputnik V vaccine (not approved by the EMA) and started a mass vaccination on 28 February of its healthcare workers.

14 April 2021, Armenia agreed with Russia on purchase of 1 million doses of coronavirus vaccines Sputnik V. This was the decision of Armenian health minister Anahit Avanesyan. The Armenian authorities have begun negotiations with Russia on the production of the Sputnik V coronavirus vaccine. Head of the Armenian Ministry of Health Anahit Avanesyan stated this at a press conference on 12 March 2021.

==== Public opinion polls ====
An opinion poll of Canadians conducted by Léger in August 2020 found that a majority (68%) would not take the Russian vaccine if offered a free dose, compared to 14% who said they would take it. When Americans were asked the same question, 59% would not take the Russian vaccine if offered a free dose, compared to 24% who said they would take it. In June 2021, according to a poll conducted by Ost-Ausschuss der Deutschen Wirtschaft (German Eastern Business Association), a majority (60%) of Germans would use the Russian vaccine Sputnik V if they had the opportunity to do so. With 71% approval, the values in East Germany are significantly higher, but with 58% of the respondents there is also a solid majority in West Germany. 38% of respondents, on the other hand, would not want to use Sputnik V.

In July 2020, opinion polls suggested around 90% of the Russian population had doubts about the vaccine but by September this had dropped to around half the Russian population. In May 2021, the Levada Center released a poll of 1,614 respondents from 50 regions which showed that 26% of Russians were prepared to be vaccinated with Sputnik V, while 62% were not prepared to be vaccinated. Ten percent of respondents had already been vaccinated.

=== Resale controversy ===
Under a resale arrangement, the Russian Direct Investment Fund (RDIF) offered Abu Dhabi-based firm, Aurugulf Health Investments the exclusive rights to sell the Sputnik V coronavirus vaccine. According to media reports, the vaccine was intended to be sold to a host of countries at huge premiums. As per documents reviewed by The Moscow Times, Emirati Sheikh Ahmed Dalmook al-Maktoum, a Dubai royal, worked as the middleman for reselling millions of Sputnik V vaccine doses to countries in dire need of COVID-19 vaccine at a higher premium. Corporate registry data showed that one of the two entities controlling Aurugulf is Royal Group, a conglomerate headed by UAE national security advisor, Sheikh Tahnoon bin Zayed al-Nahyan. Acquired documents, interviews with officials and buyer data showed that countries like Pakistan, Guyana, which were on the receiving end of the vaccine from the UAE, were coerced to pay more than double the price advertised by Russia. The same deal was further used for reselling 1 million Sputnik V vaccine doses by the Emirati royal Sheikh Ahmed Dalmook al-Maktoum to Kenya for huge mark-ups. However, the deal eventually failed as Nairobi learnt of the first shipment consisting of 75,000 doses not coming directly from Russia.

=== Scientific assessment ===
On 11 August 2020, a World Health Organization (WHO) spokesperson said "prequalification of any vaccine includes the rigorous review and assessment of all required safety and efficacy data". A WHO assistant director said, "You cannot use a vaccine or drugs or medicines without following through all of these stages, having complied with all of these stages".

François Balloux, a geneticist at University College London, called the Russian government's approval of Gam-COVID-Vac a "reckless and foolish decision". Professor Paul Offit, the director of the Vaccine Education Center at Children's Hospital of Philadelphia, characterized the announcement as a "political stunt", and stated that the untested vaccine could be harmful.

Stephen Griffin, Associate Professor in the School of Medicine, University of Leeds, said "we can be cautiously optimistic that SARS-CoV2 vaccines targeting the spike protein are effective". Moreover, as the Sputnik antigen is delivered via a different modality, namely using a disabled Adenovirus rather than formulated RNA, this provides flexibility in terms of perhaps one or other method providing better responses in certain age-groups, ethnicities, etc., plus the storage of this vaccine ought to be more straightforward.

"There is a huge risk that confidence in vaccines would be damaged by a vaccine that received approval and was then shown to be harmful", said immunologist Peter Openshaw.

Ian Jones, a professor of virology at the University of Reading, and Polly Roy, professor and Chair of Virology at the London School of Hygiene and Tropical Medicine, commenting on phase III results published in The Lancet in February 2021, said "The development of the Sputnik V vaccine has been criticised for unseemly haste, corner cutting, and an absence of transparency. But the outcome reported here is clear and the scientific principle of vaccination is demonstrated, which means another vaccine can now join the fight to reduce the incidence of COVID-19."

On 12 May 2021, a group of biostatisticians published an article in The Lancet about data discrepancies and substandard reporting of interim data of the Sputnik V phase-III trial. According to the article, the lack of transparency of the trial results raises serious concerns. Data inconsistencies were found, including an extremely low probability of homogeneity of vaccine efficacy across age groups.

Two preliminary studies, one from Argentina and one from San Marino, found mostly mild adverse events and no vaccine-associated deaths. Another study carried out in San Marino has concluded a high tolerability profile in the population aged ≥60 years in terms of short-term adverse events following immunization.

An article published by the journal Nature on 6 July 2021 cited data released by the United Arab Emirates on some 81,000 individuals who had received Sputnik V, according to which the vaccine demonstrated an efficacy of 97.8% in preventing symptomatic COVID-19, and 100% efficacy in preventing severe complications. The figures echoed similar findings from unpublished data on 3.8 million Russians, according to which Sputnik V demonstrated an efficacy of 97.7%.

A study published by the Journal of Medical Internet Research analysed the dataset consisted of 11,515 self-reported Sputnik V vaccine adverse events posted on Telegram. Telegram users complained mostly about pain, fever, fatigue, and headache.

== See also ==
- List of Russian drugs
