= Gamaleya Research Institute of Epidemiology and Microbiology =

Public-private organization for vaccine development

Coordinates: 55.8017°N 37.4576°E

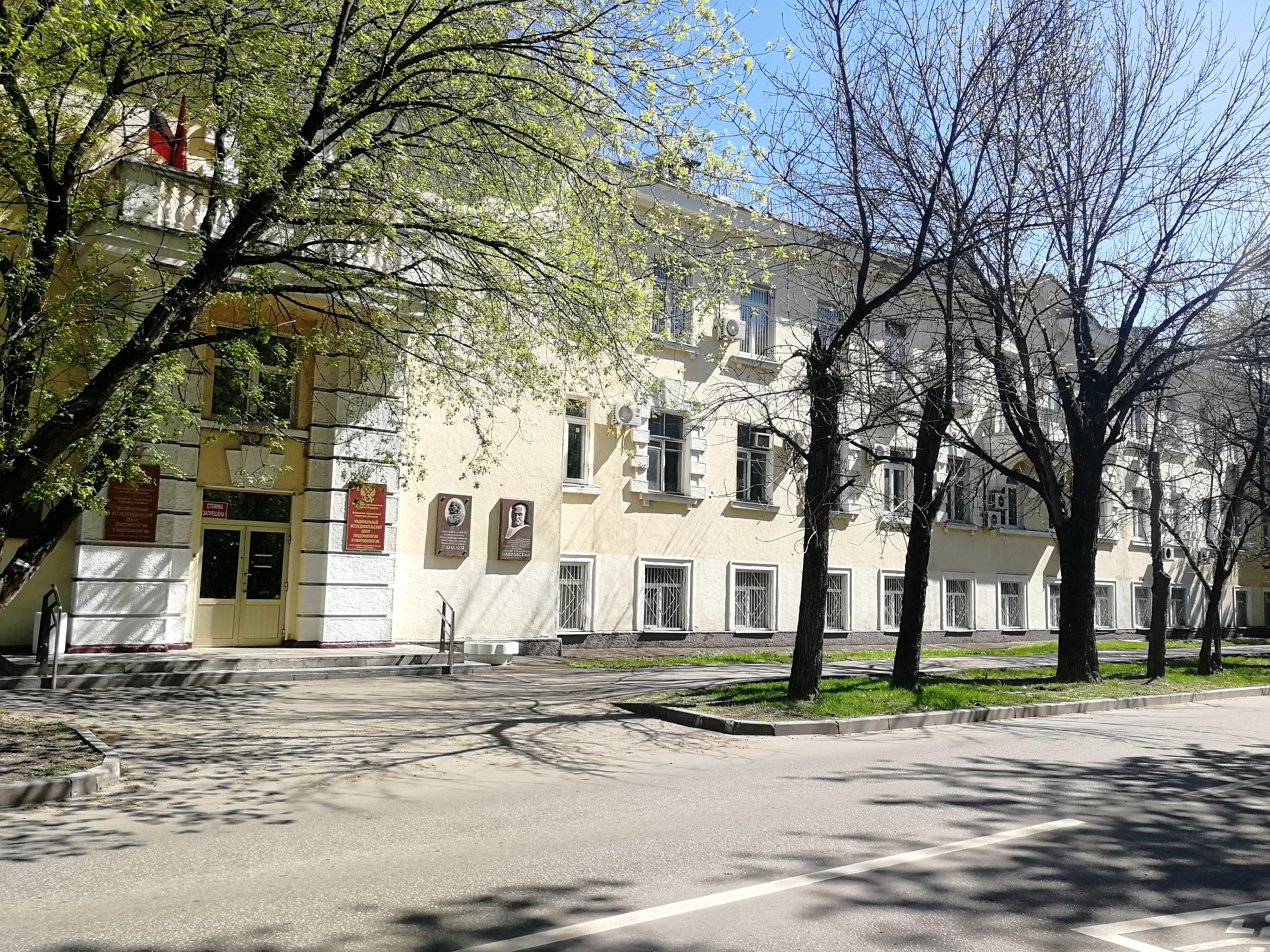
- Formation: 1891; 135 years ago (as N. F. Gamaleya Federal Research Center for Epidemiology & Microbiology)
- Founder: Filipp Blymenthal
- Purpose: Fund vaccine development
- Headquarters: 18 Gamaleya Street; Moscow, Russia 123098
- Director General: Alexander Gintsburg
- Parent organization: Ministry of Health of the Russian Federation
- Staff: 379 (including 92 professors)
- Website: gamaleya.org (in Russian) gamaleya.org/en(in English)

The Gamaleya Research Institute of Epidemiology and Microbiology, (Note: Russian: Национальный исследовательский центр эпидемиологии и микробиологии имени почётного академика Н. Ф. Гамалеи, romanized: Natsional’nyy isslyedovatyel’skiy tsentr epidyemiologii i mikrobiologii imyeni pochetnogo akadyemika N. F. Gamalyei) previously the N. F. Gamaleya Federal Research Center for Epidemiology & Microbiology, is a Russian medical-research institute within the Ministry of Health of the Russian Federation. (Note: Other names include the Gamaleya Scientific Research Institute or Gamaleya National Research Center for Epidemiology and Microbiology)

Founded in 1891 by Filipp Markovich Blyumental, it is named after Soviet scientist Nikolay Fyodorovich Gamaleya (1859–1949), famed as a pioneer in microbiology and in vaccine research. The institute is best known internationally for developing the earliest vaccine for SARS-CoV-2, in collaboration with the 48th Central Research Institute of the Ministry of Defence in response to the COVID-19 pandemic.

== History ==
The institution was founded in 1891 as a private bacteriology- and chemical-microscopy-oriented laboratory, which later became the Blumenthal Institute for Bacteriology and Chemistry. It was nationalised in 1919.

== Research ==
=== Ebola ===
In May 2017, the Institute announced that it would deliver 1,000 doses of its vaccine candidate, GamEvac-Combi, to Guinea for Ebola testing. According to a Xinhua report, it was considered to be an approved Ebola vaccine, although GamEvac-Combi was licensed only in Russia, and did not have a multinational license approved by the World Health Organization, as of November 2019.

=== COVID-19 vaccine ===
In May 2020, the centre announced that it had developed a COVID-19 vaccine candidate. The project was funded by the Russian National Wealth Fund. A Phase I trial was completed on 18 June 2020 and Phase II was reported as completed in July 2020.

On 11 August 2020, the Russian President Vladimir Putin declared that the institute registered a COVID-19 vaccine called Gam-COVID-Vac trade name Sputnik V.

Protest developed in the international scientific community over the announcement of the vaccine registration in Russia, mainly because there has been no publication of results from clinical trials on Gam-COVID-Vac. At the time of registration, there was no evidence for the safety, effective dose, biomarkers of an immune response, or efficacy against COVID-19 infection. As of 8 August 2020, no reputable scientific report on the Gam-COVID-Vac candidate had been published.

On 4 September 2020, data on 76 participants in the Phase I-II trial were published, indicating preliminary evidence of safety and an immune response. Days later, however, the results were challenged by 27 international vaccine scientists as being incomplete, suspicious, and unreliable, when identical data were reported for many of the trial participants.

On 2 February 2021, results of Phase III clinical trials involving 21,977 participants in Moscow were published in The Lancet, showing 91.6% efficacy of the vaccine, and therefore responding, even if with considerable delays, to previous criticism. The study was subject to considerable criticism by researchers, citing restricted access to research data and inconsistencies in the published data. The authors replied that access had been granted and that inconsistencies were due to typing errors. Registration of the vaccine with the European Medicines Agency, the EU's medical regulator, dragged on. Discussions about data gaps related to the vaccine continued through July 2021.
