= Russian Direct Investment Fund =

Fund established by the Russian government in June 2011

- RDIF logo
- Native name: Российский фонд прямых инвестиций
- Industry: Sovereign wealth fund
- Founded: 2011
- Website: www.rdif.ru

The Russian Direct Investment Fund (Russian: Российский фонд прямых инвестиций, RDIF) is Russia's sovereign wealth fund established in 2011 by the Russian government with the stated goal to make investments in companies of high-growth sectors of the Russian economy.

Kirill Dmitriev is the RDIF's chief executive officer. Dmitriev has long-standing connections to Vladimir Putin's family. The fund has doled out funds to associates and family members of Putin.

Following the 2022 Russian invasion of Ukraine, numerous states have sanctioned RDIF. In the recital of the decision by the United States to sanction RDIF, the Office of Foreign Assets Control labeled RDIF as a slush fund for Vladimir Putin and as emblematic of Russia's broader kleptocracy.

== History ==
RDIF was founded in June 2011 under the leadership of both Russian President Dmitry Medvedev and Prime Minister Vladimir Putin.

In June 2012, RDIF and China Investment Corporation (CIC) established the Russian-Chinese Investment Fund. On 2 June 2016, President of the Russian Federation Vladimir Putin signed Federal Law on the Russian Direct Investment Fund changing the status of RDIF. According to the law, RDIF became the sovereign wealth fund of the Russian Federation.

=== Value ===
In June 2023 Russia claimed the fund exceeded 2.1 trillion rubles invested in the Russian economy.

RDIF's reserved capital under management equals $10 billion. RDIF has invested and committed for this purpose 2.1 trillion rubles, of which RDIF invested 200 billion rubles and 1.9 trillion rubles came from co-investors, partners and banks. RDIF also attracted over $40 billion of foreign capital into the Russian economy through long-term strategic partnerships.

=== Sanctions ===
On 28 February 2022, as a result of the 2022 Russian invasion of Ukraine, the United States placed RDIF and its chief executive on its list of sanctioned Russian entities and people. The European Union, Ukraine, United Kingdom and Australia followed later in February and in March. In the recital of the sanction decision, Office of Foreign Assets Control labeled RDIF as a slush fund for Vladimir Putin and as emblematic of Russia's broader kleptocracy.

Restrictions also apply to parties entering investments with the Fund. The EU prohibit investment, participation, or contribution to projects co-financed by RDIF.

== RDIF Management ==
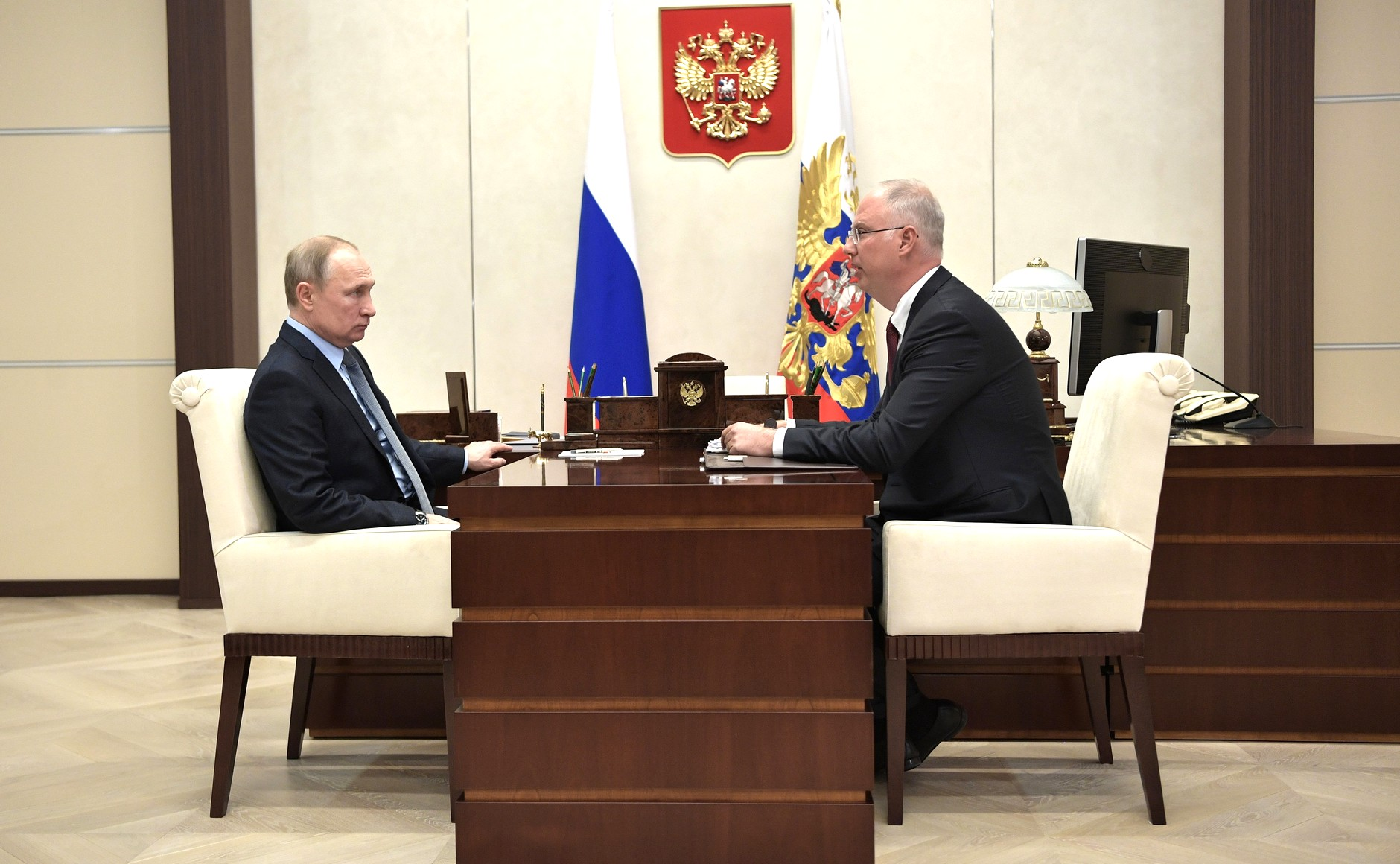
Russian President Vladimir Putin meeting with the CEO of the Russian Direct Investment Fund Kirill Dmitriev in 2020

RDIF Management structure includes Supervisory board with the government representatives, and International Advisory Board. Kirill Dmitriev has been the RDIF's CEO since its inception in 2011.

== Strategic Partnerships and Investment Platforms ==
=== The Russia-China Investment Fund ===
Together with China Investment Corporation (CIC) RDIF created a $2 billion Russia-China Investment Fund.

=== RDIF and Mubadala co-investment fund ===
RDIF and Mubadala Development company (Mubadala), the Abu Dhabi-based investment and development company, agreed to launch a $2 billion co-investment fund to pursue opportunities in Russia.

=== The Russia-Saudi Investment Fund ===
In 2015, RDIF entered into an agreement with Saudi Arabia’s sovereign wealth fund, the Public Investment Fund (PIF), to invest in projects in Russia.

=== The Russia-France Investment Platform ===
RDIF and Caisse des Dépôts International (CDC International) have launched the Russia-France Investment Platform, which will seek attractive investments across a broad range of sectors and asset classes.

=== RDIF and Qatar Holding co-investment fund ===
RDIF and Qatar Holding, the Qatar sovereign wealth fund, announced the launch of co-investment fund.

=== The Russian-Italian investment platform ===
RDIF and Fondo Strategico Italiano (FSI) agreed to establish a €1 billion Russian-Italian investment platform. The two financial institutions will invest in companies and projects promoting the development of foreign trade and increase of FDI between Italy and Russia.

=== The Russia-Japan Investment Fund ===
RDIF and Japan Bank for International Cooperation (JBIC) established a Russia-Japan Investment Fund (RJIF). RJIF will seek and realise attractive investment projects to promote economic, trade and investment cooperation between Japan and Russia. Under the MoU, RDIF and JBIC have agreed that each of them will invest $500 million for the joint investments through RJIF and a joint investment framework.

=== Collaboration with Kuwait Investment Authority ===
RDIF launched an automatic co-investment mechanism, with the first $500 million from Kuwait Investment Authority (KIA). Later KIA doubled its investment with RDIF to $1 billion.

=== Memorandum of Understanding between RDIF and Mumtalakat ===
RDIF and Mumtalakat, the investment arm of the Kingdom of Bahrain, signed an MoU to promote investment cooperation between Russia and Bahrain.

=== Collaboration with Rönesans Holding ===
RDIF and Rönesans Holding, the leading construction, real estate development and investment company in Turkey, reached an agreement to expand the scope of their joint investment activities. The parties are focused on attractive investment opportunities within the Russian Federation; and have identified healthcare, construction, infrastructure and commercial real estate as priority sectors.

=== The Russia-China Venture Fund ===
RDIF and Chinese company Tus-Holdings agreed to establish a joint Russia-China Venture Fund (RCVF).

=== RDIF-Danantara investment fund agreement ===
In mid-June 2025, the Indonesian sovereign fund Danantara and the Russian Direct Investment Fund signed an agreement to create an investment fund worth 2 billion Euros (US$2.9 billion) at the 2025 St Petersburg International Economic Forum.

== RDIF Investments ==
RDIF investments are focused on 6 areas:

=== Improving quality of life ===
- Mother and child
- Geropharm
- Nationwide cancer diagnosis and treatment network
- Nationwide waste to energy eco-friendly programme
- Detsky Mir
- City hospital No. 40 in St. Petersburg
- Кaro Film
- World Class
- Alium

=== Infrastructure development ===
- Construction оf a technopark on the former «Тushino» Аerodrome territory
- Construction of Central Ring Road 3 and 4
- First railway bridge between Russia and China
- Moscow Exchange
- Pulkovo Airport
- Rönesans Holding
- Transneft
- M4 highway (Russia)
- Enel Russia
- Aeroflot
- Inter RAO
- Sovcombank
- Electroshield Samara
- Construction of a motor road in the Krasnodar far western bypass section

=== Import substitution and export potential ===
- UFC
- Zapsibneftekhim
- Voltyre-Prom
- Russian Helicopters
- Ust-Luga Marine Terminal
- PhosAgro
- Dakaitaowa
- Arc International
- En+ Group
- C.P. Group
- TH Milk
- Intergeo
- Orenbeef

=== Regional development ===
- The construction of small hydroelectric power plants in Karelia
- Elimination of “digital inequality”
- Vladivostok International Airport
- Tigers Realm Coal
- Magnit
- Alrosa
- Lenta (retail)

=== Efficiency growth ===
- Cotton Way
- Logistics platform PLT
- Globaltruck
- AutoPartners

=== Technological development ===
- AliExpress Russia
- Deliver
- Hyperloop
- Motorika

== See also ==
- Russian National Wealth Fund
