= Grésin plaque =

Red terracotta tile with pagan figures

External image
- Photograph of the Grésin plaque via the Musée des Antiquités Nationales.

The Grésin plaque (sometimes called the plaque du Broc) is a red terracotta tile discovered in France, featuring intermingled early Christian and Germanic pagan iconography. It has been dated to sometime before the 8th century CE.

== Provenance ==
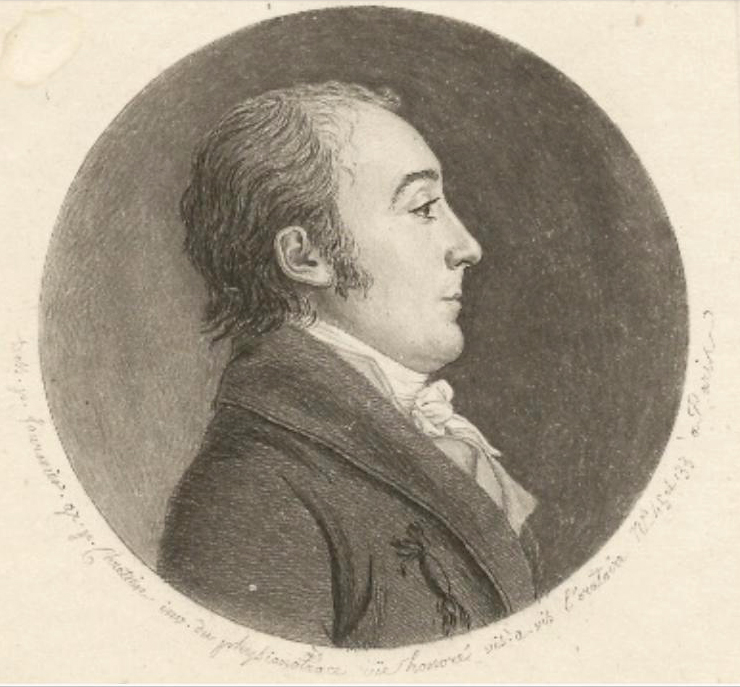
Jacques-Antoine Dulaure, discoverer of the Grésin plaque.

The plaque was discovered in the commune of Le Broc, Puy-de-Dôme before 1830 by Jacques-Antoine Dulaure. It was supposedly among twenty which covered a tomb unearthed in Blanède, near Grésin. Thereafter, the plaque was successively in the possession of Maurice Girot, subprefect of Issoire; Pierre-Pardoux Mathieu, archaeologist and professor at Issoire; and Gustave Grange, an antique dealer from Clermont-Ferrand. The plaque was donated to the Musée des Antiquités Nationales by Gustave Grange's grandson, Louis, in 1952.

== Appearance and interpretation ==
The tile is red terracotta and measures 42 cm by 27.5 cm by 3.5 cm. Before firing, a piglet trampled on the edge of the plaque, leaving an imprint. The designs were obtained by stamping the soft clay with a matrix. A known 3rd-century Gallo-Roman matrix was used to render the lion's heads.

The tile depicts a human figure head-on (though his feet are in profile) with arms bent at the elbows. His face is circular and beardless. The figure's forehead is marked with a monogrammatic cross in between an alpha and omega and he appears to wear a headdress (perhaps a diadem or tiara). In his left hand he wields a spear, in his right a circular object. A sword hangs off his belt. A serpent slithers underfoot while three lion's heads menace him from his left. He is dressed in a belted tunic, cape and boots. His penis is visible between his legs. He also wears a necklace.

The identification of this figure with Christ was first proposed by Mathieu in 1846. The figure is thus Christ fighting the serpent and lion's heads, early Christian symbols of evil. (Note: French medievalist Inès Villela-Petit cites Psalm 91:13 ("Thou shalt tread upon the lion and adder: the young lion and the dragon shalt thou trample under feet.") and such early Christian images as the 6th-century mosaic of Christ at Archbishop's Chapel, Ravenna to show that these symbols had such a significance for early Christians.) The objects in either hand are perhaps a lance and a globe, mingling symbols of Roman imperial victory with those of Christ's triumph. The archaeologist Raymond Lantier is among those who support this interpretation, comparing this synthesis to that of the Niederdollendorf stone.

Though the Christian influence on the plaque is undeniable, the bizarreness of the iconography frustrates identification of the figure with Christ. As archaeologist Michael Friedrich has put it, "why is the figure naked, what is the disc-shaped object in its right hand, and what do the three lion heads mean? [...] explaining this figure as a somewhat odd vernacular ‘Germanic’ representation of Christ falls short." The historian J. M. Wallace-Hadrill has gone as far as to say that "were it not for the presence of the Christian monogram with alpha and omega it would never occur to anyone to detect Christ here".

Pagan influence on the design has been supposed, represented by such features as the visible phallus. French medievalist Inès Villela-Petit noted attributes of the Gallic pagan god Lugus in the figure (the beardless face, chained necklace, headdress, and spear). German archaeologist Michael P. Speidel sees the plaque as depicting the Germanic pagan god Balder fighting, and flaunting his penis at, threatening beasts.

== Date ==
Due to its crude execution, the tile's authenticity was, for a time, questioned. Pierre-François Fournier, for example, believed it to be an 18th-century hoax. In the 1980s, a sample was taken from the back in order to perform thermoluminescence dating, which confirmed that the plaque was at least 1000 years old. However, a wide range of dates before 800 CE have been proposed for the tile. Françoise Vallet and Guirec Querre suggest a date within the 4th and 5th centuries; Inès Villela-Petit in the 5th and 6th centuries; and Alexandra Pesch and Raymond Lantier in the 7th or 8th centuries.

== See also ==
- Landelinus buckle
- Torslunda plates
