= National Archaeological Museum, France =

Museum in Saint-Germain-en-Laye

National Archaeological Museum, National domain of Saint-Germain en Laye
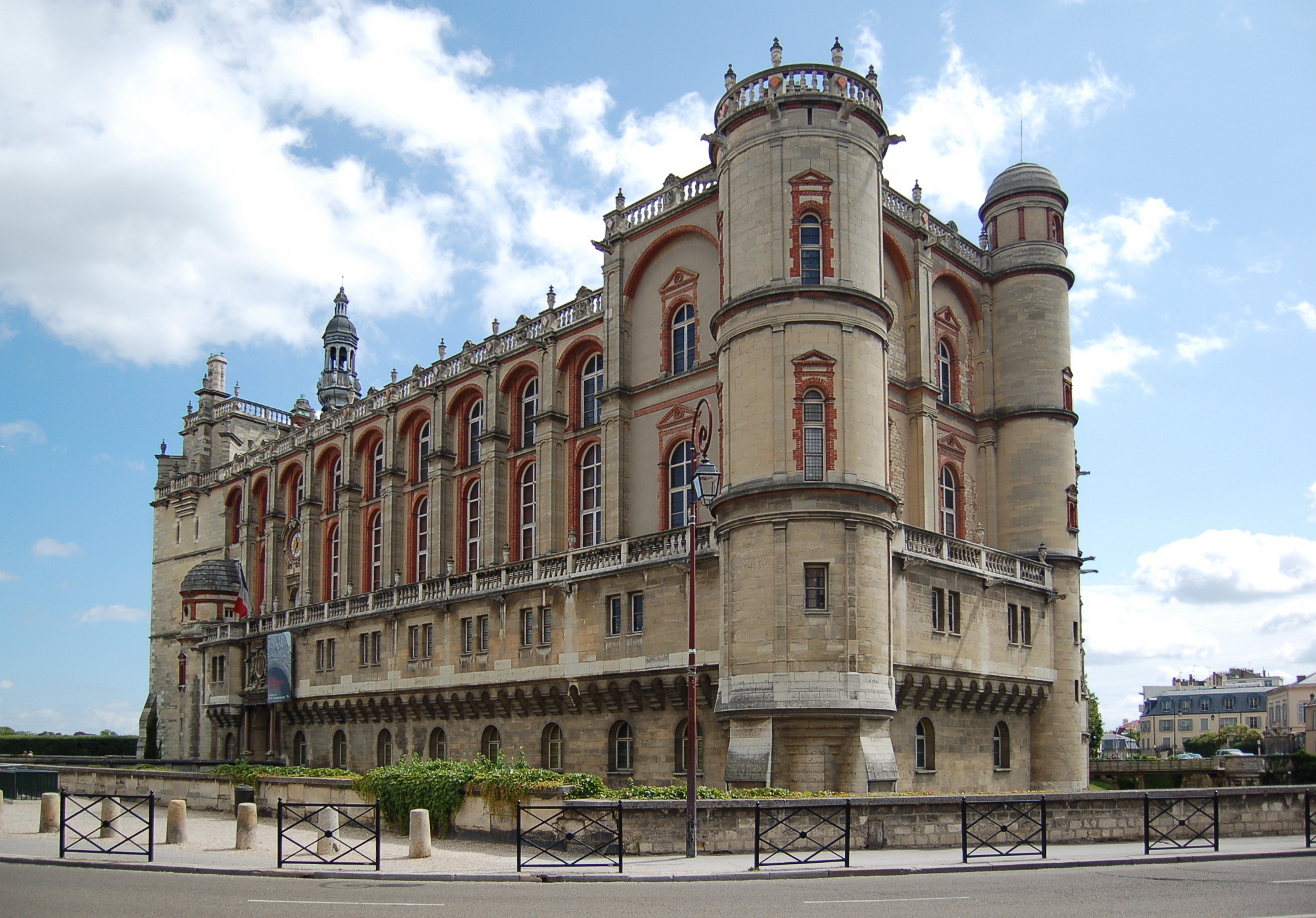
- West façade of the castle as seen from Charles de Gaulle Square

- Location within France
- Established: 1862
- Location: Place Charles de Gaulle; 78100 Saint-Germain-en-Laye, France
- Coordinates: 48°53′52″N 02°05′44″E
- Collection size: 3,000,000 items Paleolithic; Neolithic and Bronze Age; Iron Age; Roman Gaul; Early Middle Ages; Comparative archaeology of the five continents
- Visitors: 113,023 (in 2014)
- Website: Official website

The National Archaeological Museum (French: Musée d'Archéologie nationale) is a major French archaeology museum, covering prehistoric times to the Merovingian period (450–750). It is housed in the Château de Saint-Germain-en-Laye in the département of Yvelines, about 19 kilometres (12 mi) west of Paris.

== Building ==
The château had been one of the most important French royal residences in the Paris region since the 12th century. Following the move of the court to Versailles, the castle housed the court of James II of England in exile, became a cavalry school in 1809 and finally a military prison from 1836 to 1855. The château, which was in very poor condition, was classified as a monument historique on 8 April 1863.

The interior was a maze of cells, corridors, false floors and partitions. The exterior was dilapidated and covered in a black coating. The architect Eugène Millet, a pupil of Eugène Viollet-le-Duc, was given the job of restoring the château to hold the planned National Museum of Antiquities in 1855 and was told to remove all traces of the cells that the Ministry of War had installed when it was used as a prison. In 1857 he reported that all the partitions forming the cells and dungeons had been demolished and the rest of the chateau had been cleaned. Construction work began in 1862 with the destruction of the West pavilion. Millet's goal was to restore the building to its state as it was under Francis I of France. Eugène Millet died in Cannes on 24 February 1879. The restoration was continued by Auguste Lafollye and Honoré Daumet, and finally completed in 1907.

== History ==
The museum was created by imperial decree on 8 March 1862 and formally opened on 12 May 1867. Since 2009, the museum, castle and gardens have been united as one institution, marking a new era for the museum and château.

Since its inception, the museum has been titled:

- 1862: Museum of Gallo-Roman antiquities (Musée des antiquités Gallo-Romaines)
- 1867: Museum of Celtic and Gallo-Roman antiquities (Musée des antiquités celtiques et gallo-romaines)
- 1879: Museum of national antiquities (Musée des antiquités nationales)
- 2005: National archaeological museum (Musée d'archéologie nationale)
- 2009: National archaeological museum, National domain of Saint-Germain-en-Laye (Musée d'archéologie nationale, domaine national de Saint-Germain-en-Laye)

=== Museum at the time of Napoleon III ===
The Second French Empire coincides with a great expansion of archaeology in France. Napoleon III was passionately interested in history and archeology, and ordered digs, most notably in Alesia, Gergovia, and Bibracte to complete his biography of Julius Caesar. The question of conservation and storage of the finds quickly arises. The imperial decree creating the Musée Gallo-Romain (the Gallo-Roman museum) was signed by Napoleon III on 8 March 1862.

In 1864, Jean-Baptiste Verchère de Reffye, who was particularly involved in the project, proposed to the Emperor the project of a "historical museum" in order to: "provide historians with precise documents on the life of our Fathers, to invite industrial figures to study ancient manufacturing secrets, to get artists to recognise how art has evolved over time." The first meeting of the committee set up to organize the museum was held on 1 April 1865 in the office of Count Émilien de Nieuwerkerke, superintendent of the École des Beaux-Arts and in charge of imperial museums. Attendees included major figures in archaeology: Alexandre Bertrand (who became the museum's first director), Édouard Lartet, Louis Félicien de Saulcy and Jacques Boucher de Crèvecœur de Perthes.

On 11 April 1866, the committee published a report detailing the main axes of the project, the organisation of the space (by age rather than by type of object, as was the practice in the past) and an estimate of the budget.

Napoleon III inaugurated the first seven rooms of the museum on the 12 May 1867, during the Paris world fair.

=== During WW2 and the German occupation ===
Starting in 1936, and following the rise in political tensions, the museum established plans to save the artifacts, a list of the most important pieces, and preparations for evacuations. The basements, with their 2.7-meter-thick vaults, were designated as the shelter for the museum employees. Wooden boxes were built for transportation (an estimated 12 trucks were needed for transportation, but the said trucks were requisitioned by the army in 1938).

On 24 August 1939, the order was given to close the museum the next day in order to evacuate the collection, dispersed between Chambord and Cheverny. Starting 24 June 1940, the museum was occupied by German troops. Despite the efforts of Raymond Lantier to contain the German occupation, the exhibition room 1 was turned into a meeting room for the German authorities in charge of Île-de-France. Shooting exercises were held in the château’s ditch, and the museum was progressively occupied by troops. Starting 1942, the château suffered damage from bombings, which destroyed some of its stained glasses. Following the liberation of France, on 26 August 1944, the French flag was raised above the entrance and on one of the towers, ending the occupation of the museum. During this period, very little was done to the museum (apart from few acquisitions). The collections were repatriated progressively (until 15 March 1946), and the museum re-opened on 2 October 1945.

=== Renovations ===
After the war, the presentation of the museum was outdated and inadequate to meet the public's demand. Minister of Cultural Affairs André Malraux, who was passionate about archaeology, planned an ambitious renovation project started in 1961 under the direction of René Joffroy. The number of rooms was reduced to 19 and the number of pieces on display to 30,000, ending the previous "encyclopaedic" displays. The architect, André Hermant, wanted to "calm the strange decor" of the château by covering some of Millet's restoration and windows. The new layout was visited by Charles de Gaulle on 25 March 1965 and inaugurated on the 9 April 1965 by André Malraux. The renovations and the updated museology were successively rolled out up until 1984 with the opening of the comparative archaeology room, in the largest room of the castle, the room of Mars.

The courtyard's facades were renovated from 1998 to 2000, the rooms of the first floor (covering the Paleolithic to the Iron Age) were renovated from 1999 to 2006.

== Collections ==
The museum houses about 3 million archaeological objects of which about 30,000 are exhibited, making it one of the richest collections in Europe. These finds, discovered on the French territory, are presented by chronological periods: Paleolithic, Neolithic, Bronze Age, Iron Age, Roman period (Roman Gaul) and the first Middle Ages (Merovingian Gaul). A collection of foreign archaeological and ethnological objects are presented in the comparative archeology room.

=== Paleolithic ===
The Paleolithic collections include objects related to the lithic industry (choppers, bifaces, microliths, etc.), and to the bone and antler industry (including needles and harpoons). The museum introduces the evolution of the genus Homo with castings of Homo erectus and Neanderthal skulls.

Among the most famous objects of the museum's Paleolithic collections is the Venus of Brassempouy, one of the earliest known realistic representations of a human face, discovered in 1892 in one of the numerous excavations of Édouard Piette in the Pyrenees. Among the many objects that Piette housed in the museum, about 10,000 are exhibited in a dedicated room. Salle Piette was restored and reopened in 2008, with the aim of restoring the original 19th-century museology and can be visited with a guide.

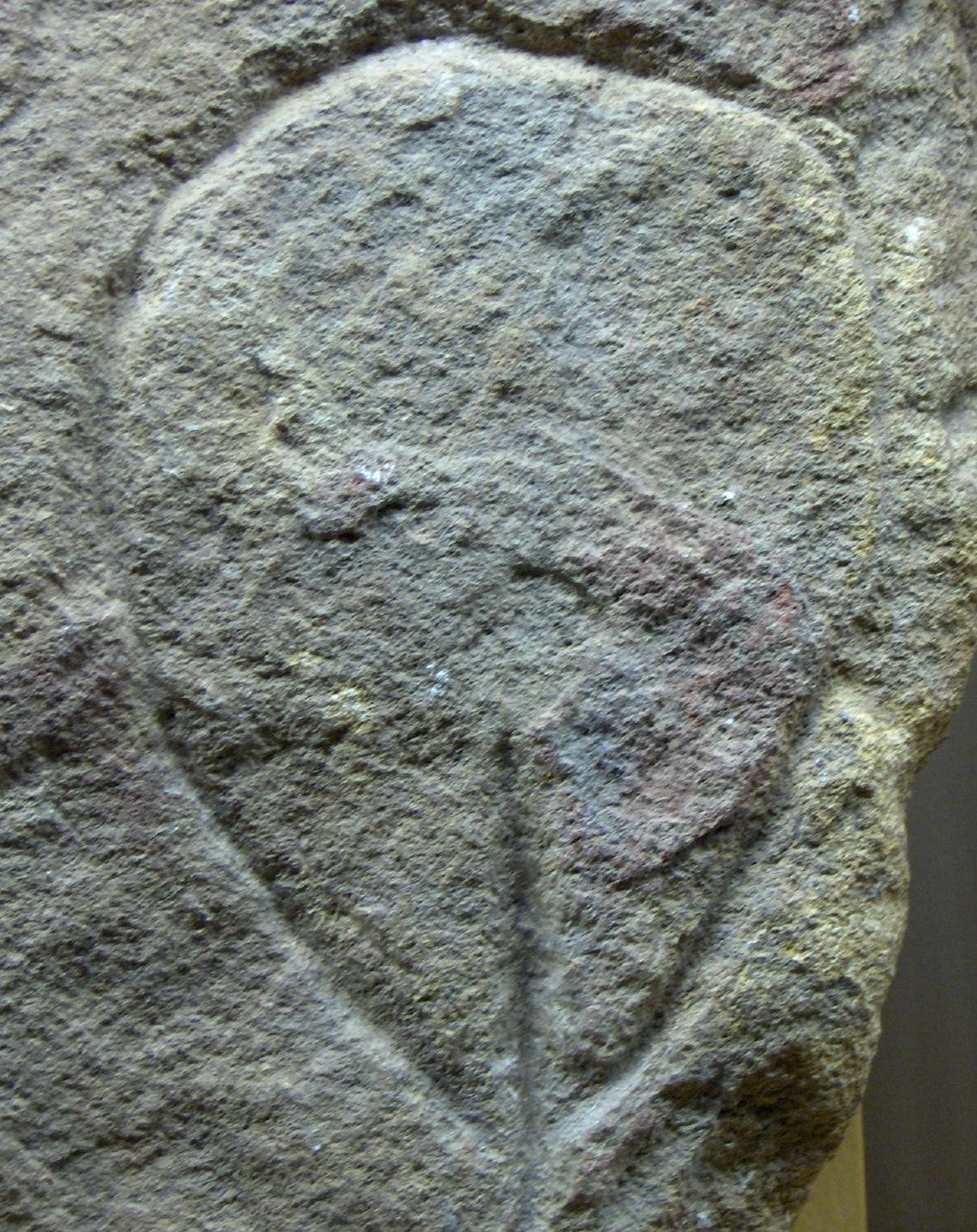
Stylised vulva, Aurignacian

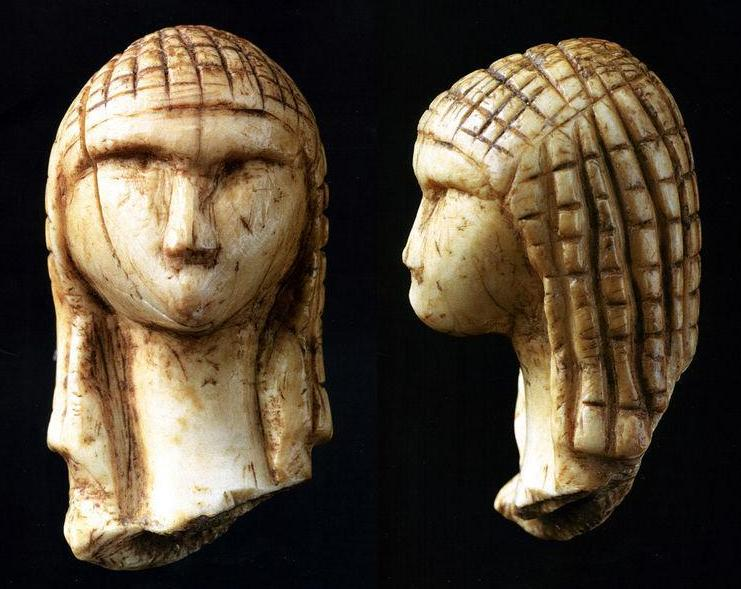
Venus of Brassempouy, Gravetian

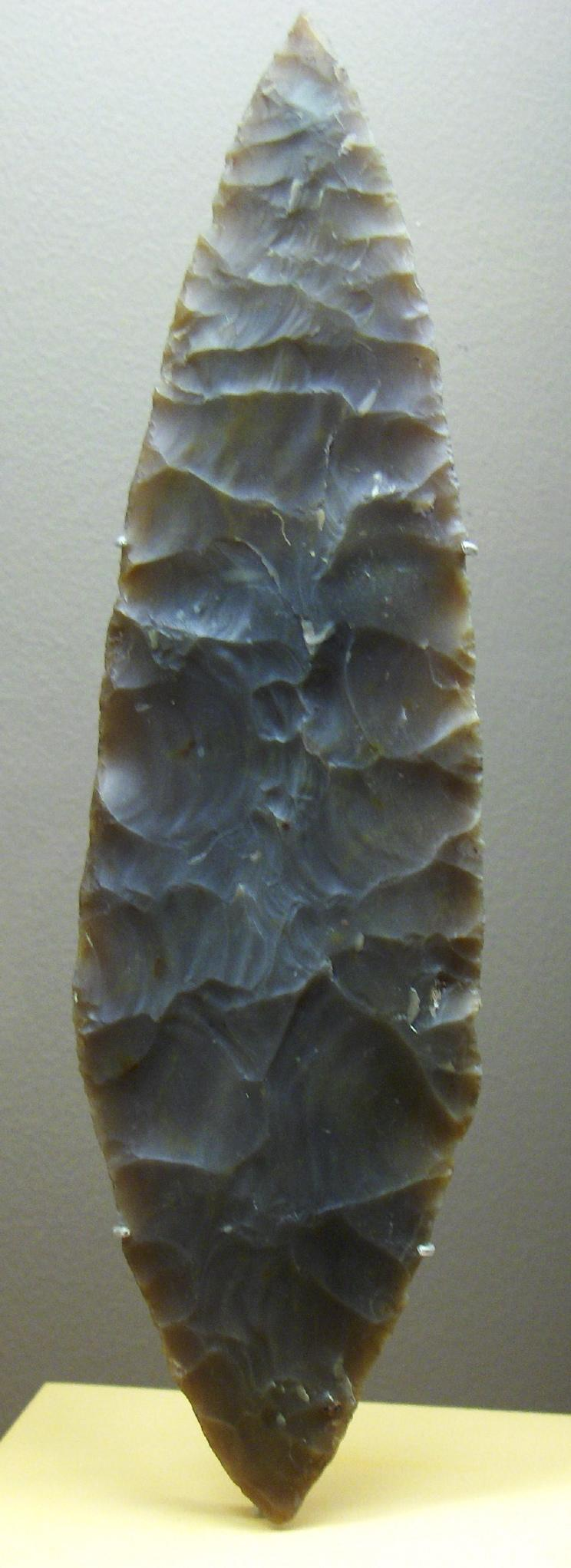
'Laurel leaf' biface Solutrean

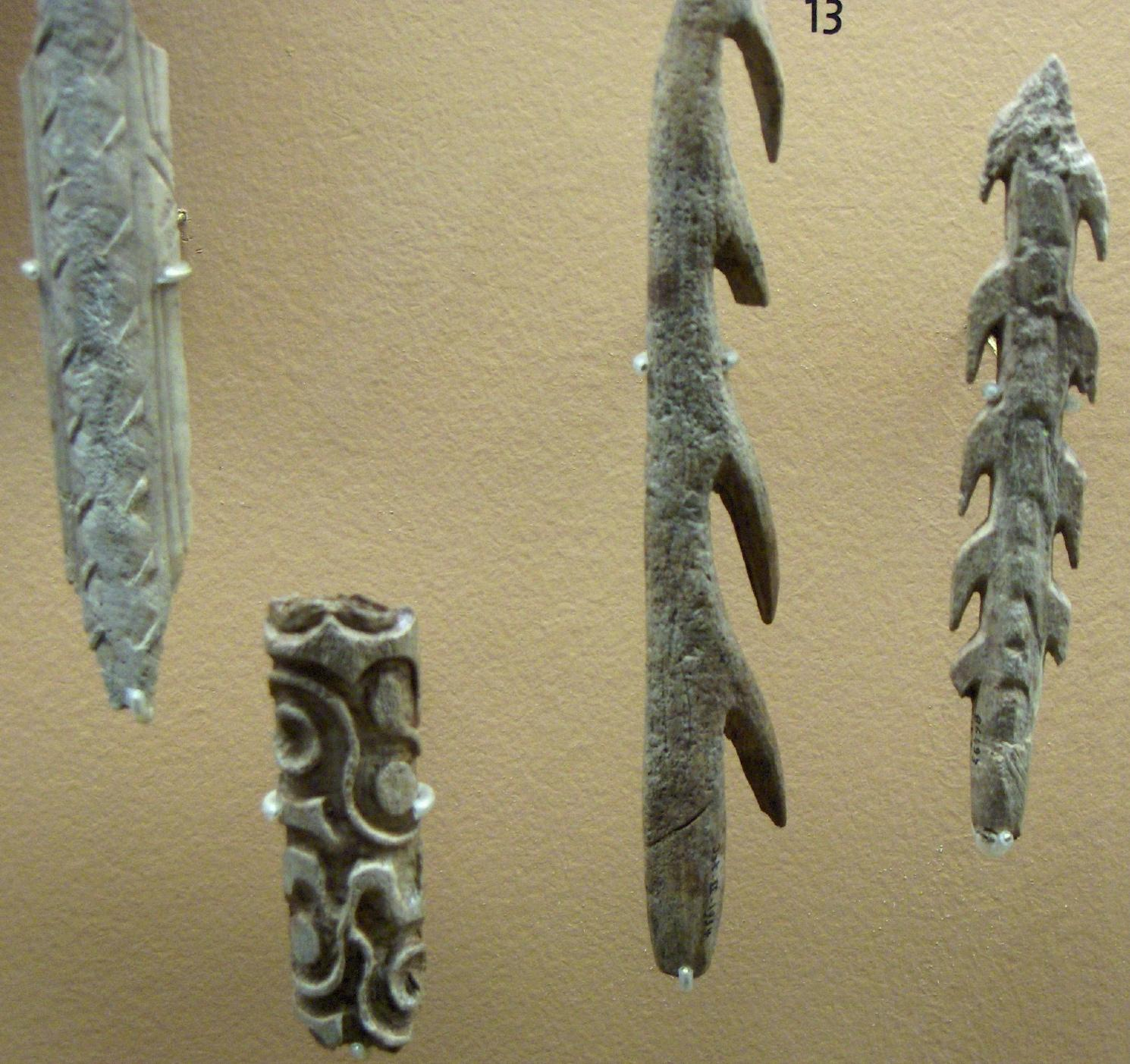
Harpoons and sculpted bones, Magdalenian

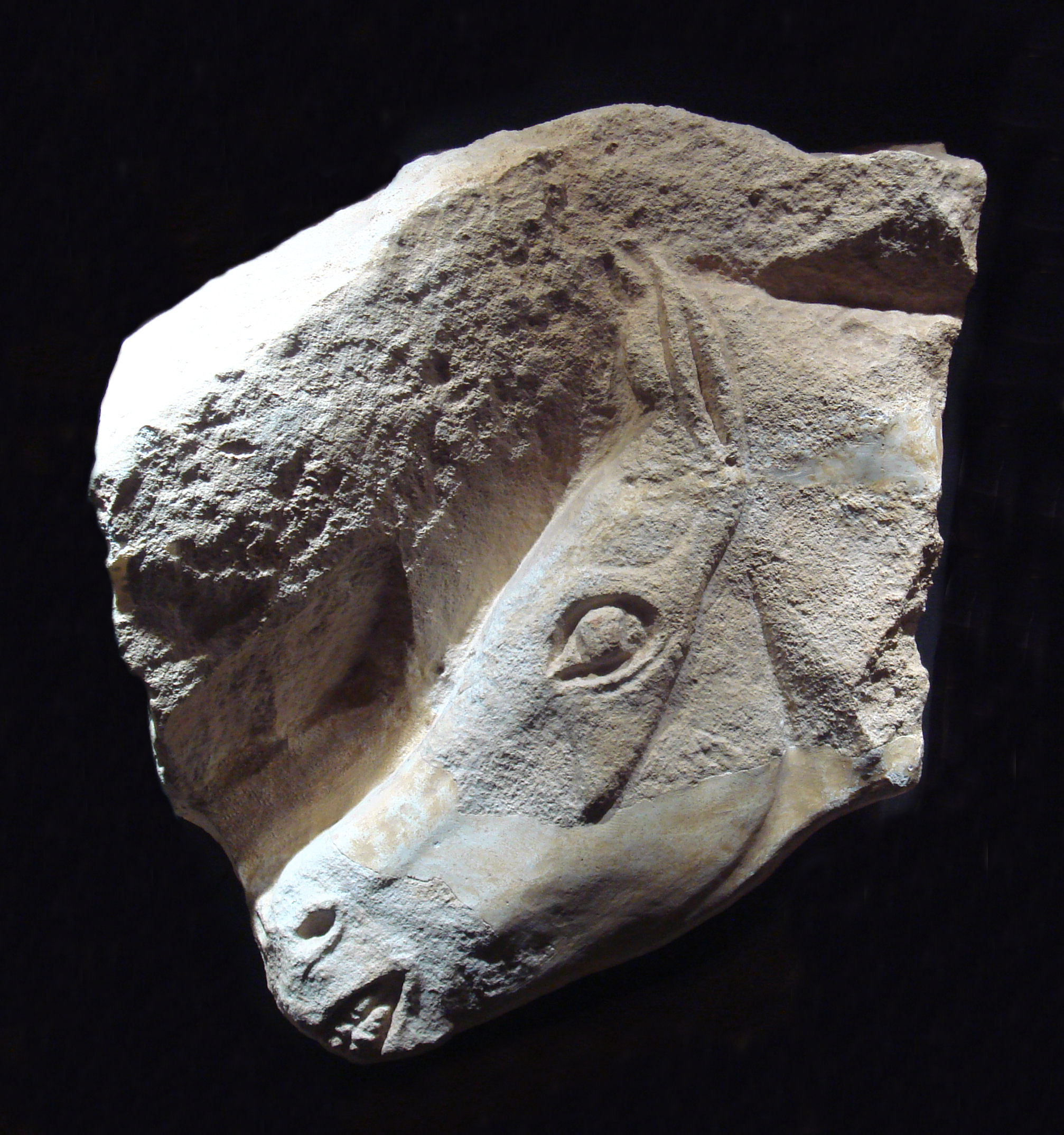
Head of a horse, Magdalenian

=== Neolithic ===
The Neolithic (around 5800 to 2100 BC) is the second period of Prehistory. The population becomes the producer of its subsistence and no longer just a predator and now influences its environment. The populations become sedentary with the appearance of agriculture and livestock. The first villages are built and the first megalithic structures erected. This period is characterized by particular technical innovations such as the polishing of stone, the appearance of ceramics and weaving. The first long-distance exchange networks are being formed.

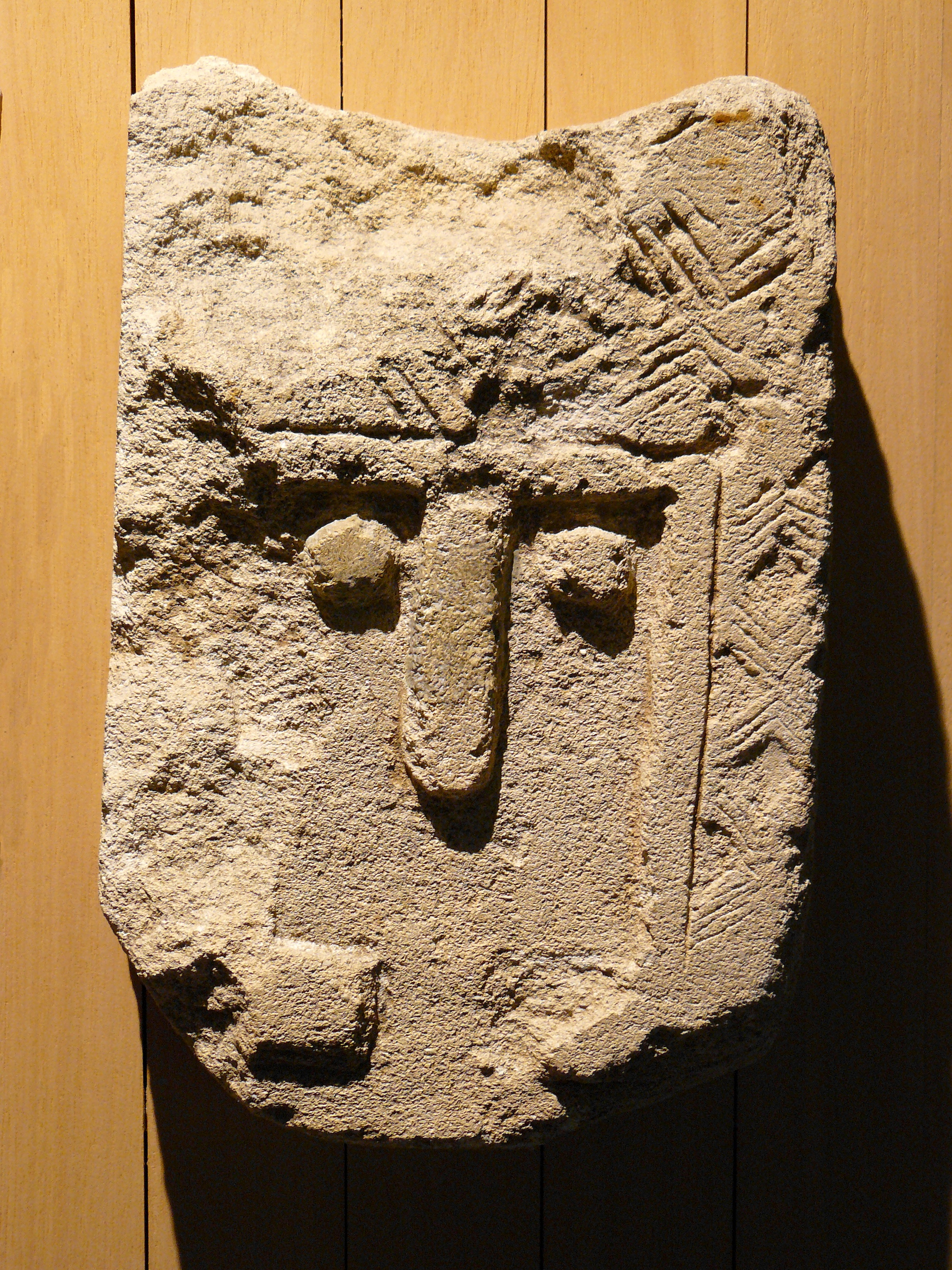
Limestone stella, circa 4th millennium BC

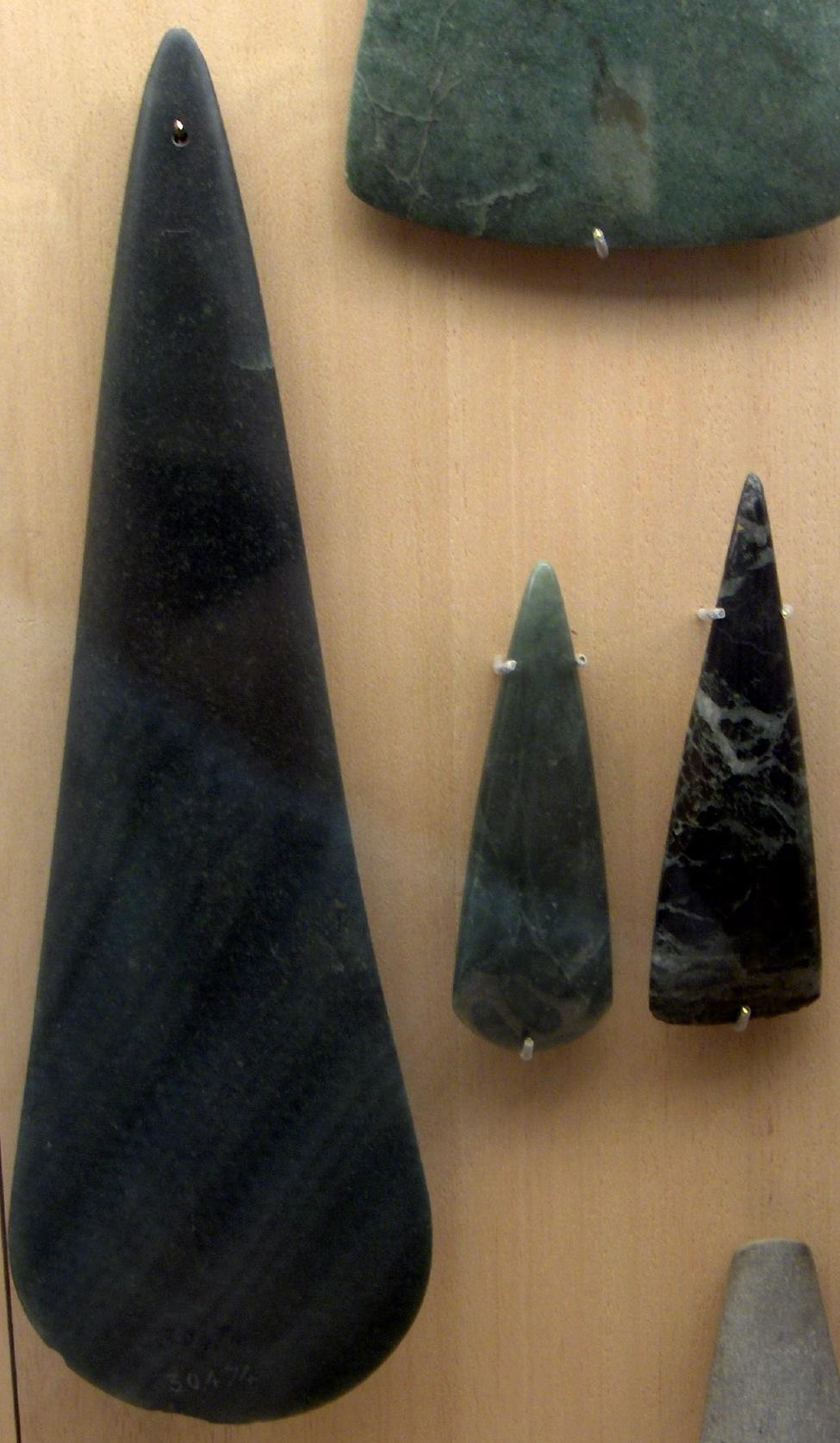
Polished axes

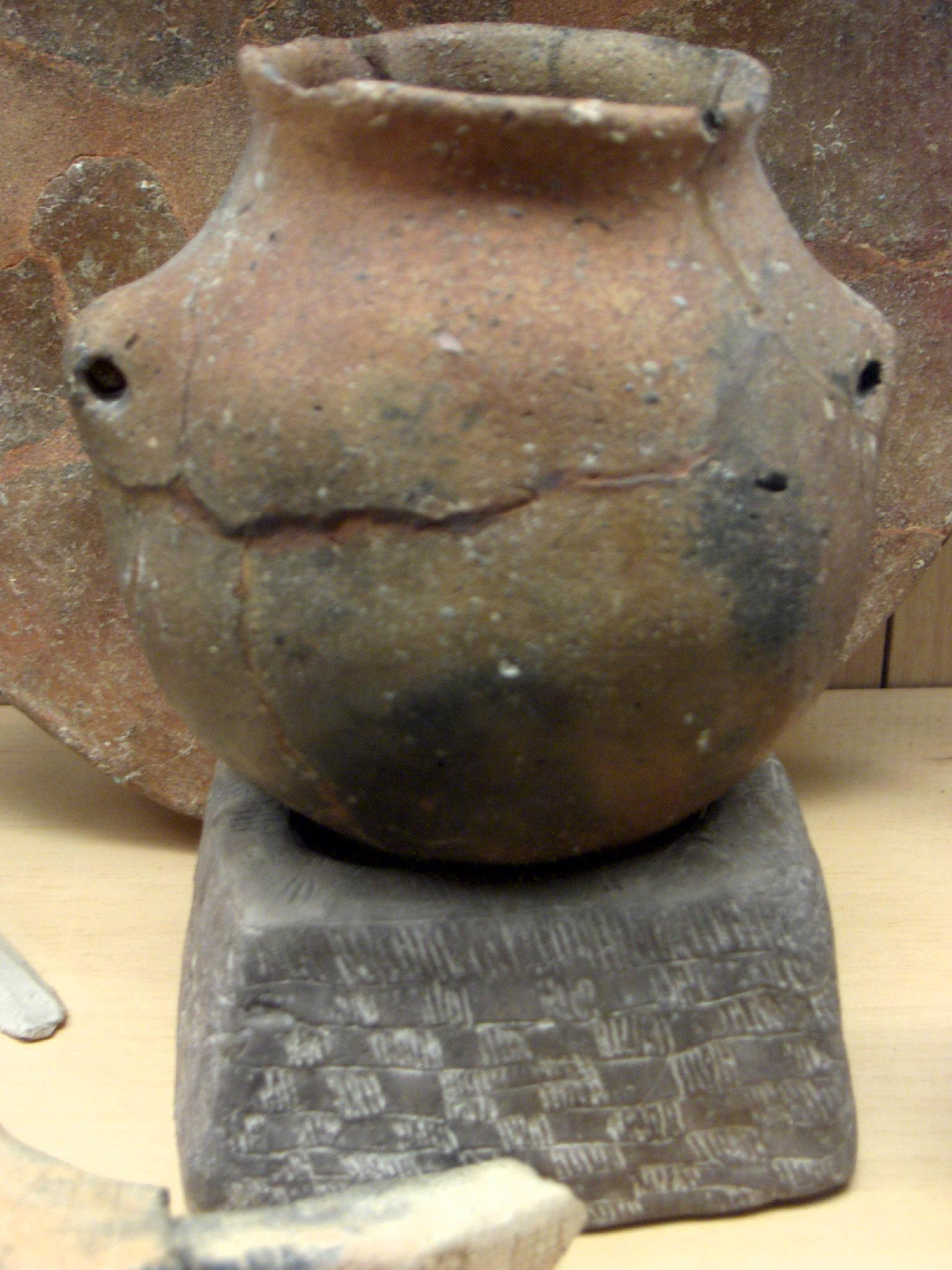
Terracotta jar

Polishing stones are visible in the ditch of the castle.

=== Bronze Age ===
In the Bronze Age (around 2100 to 750 BC), the society is still quite similar to that of the Neolithic, but the technical advances represented by bronze work will change the society which will be more and more hierarchical.

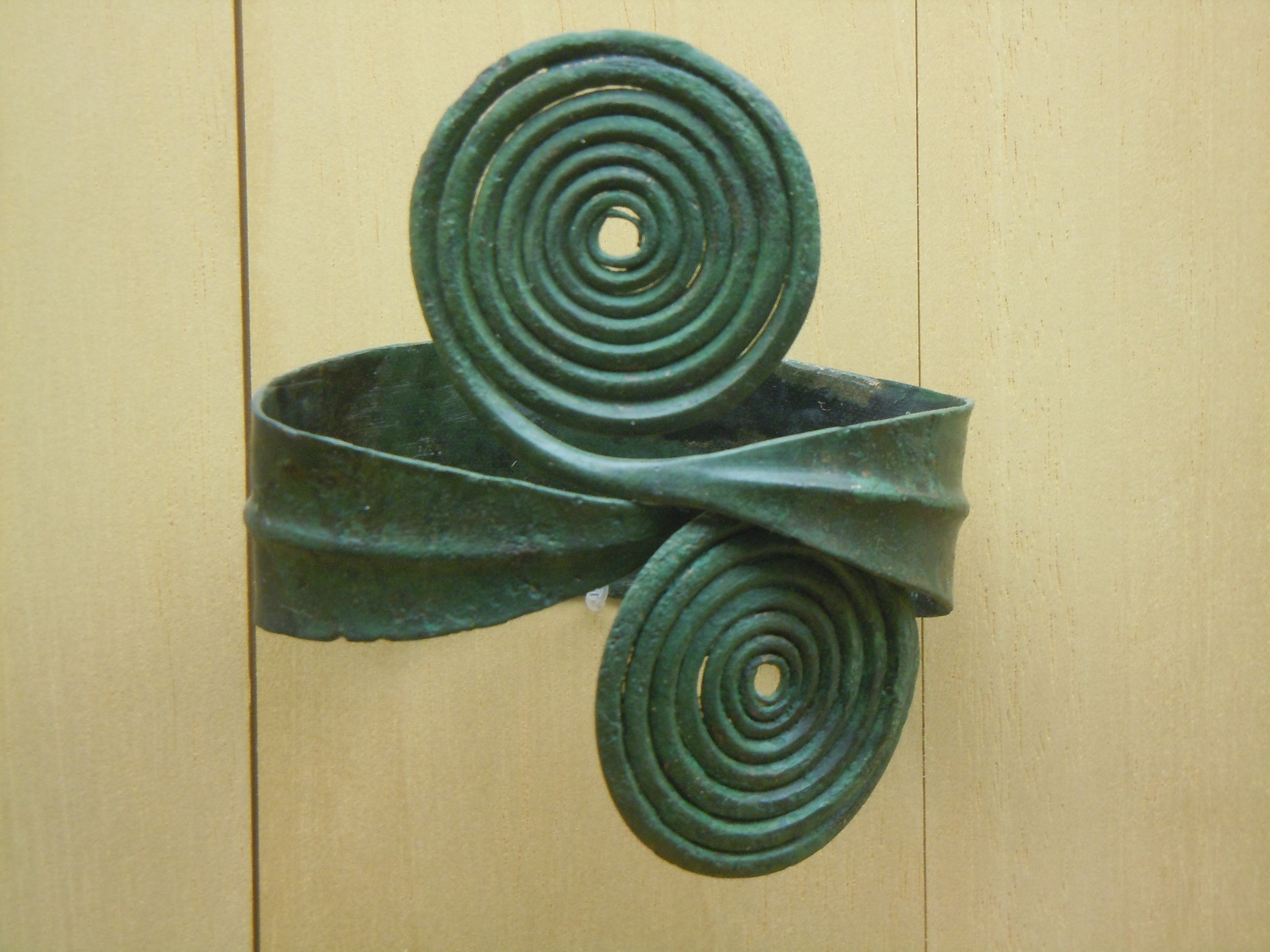
Bronze armlets (circa 1250 BC)

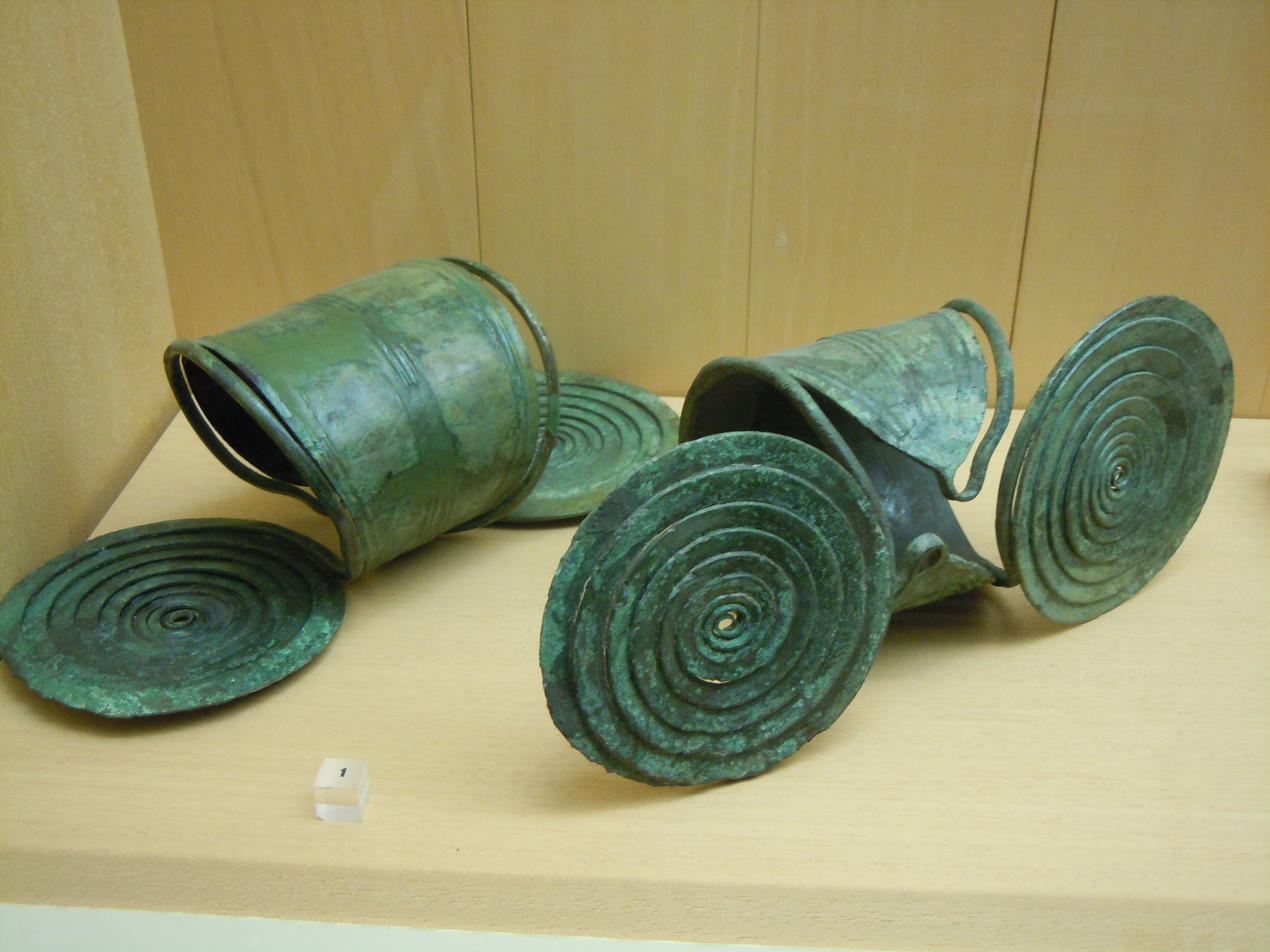
Bronze gaiters (circa 1250 BC)

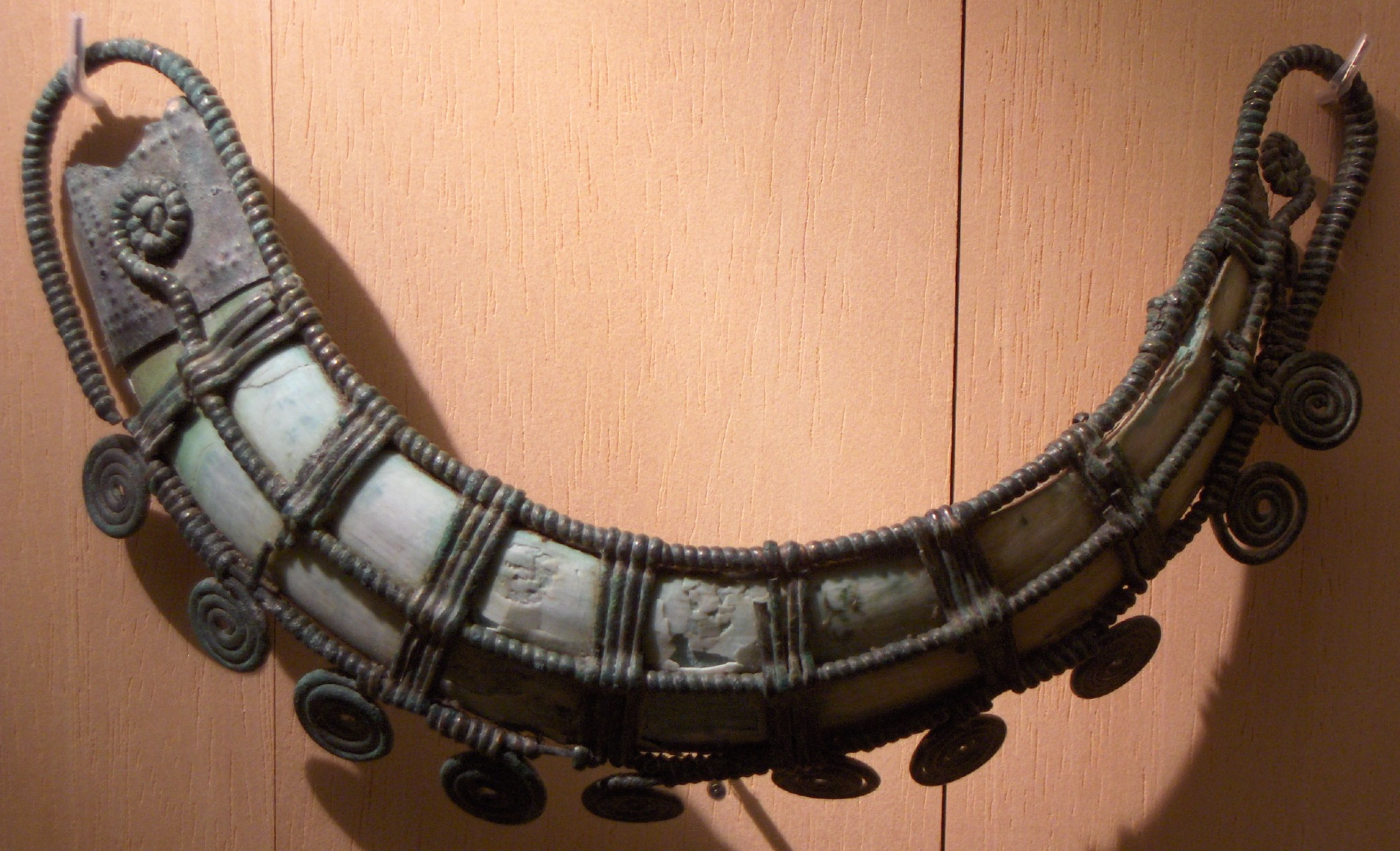
Circa 1200 BC, jewel worn on the hip, made of bronze lacework around a suidae canine, found in a burial.

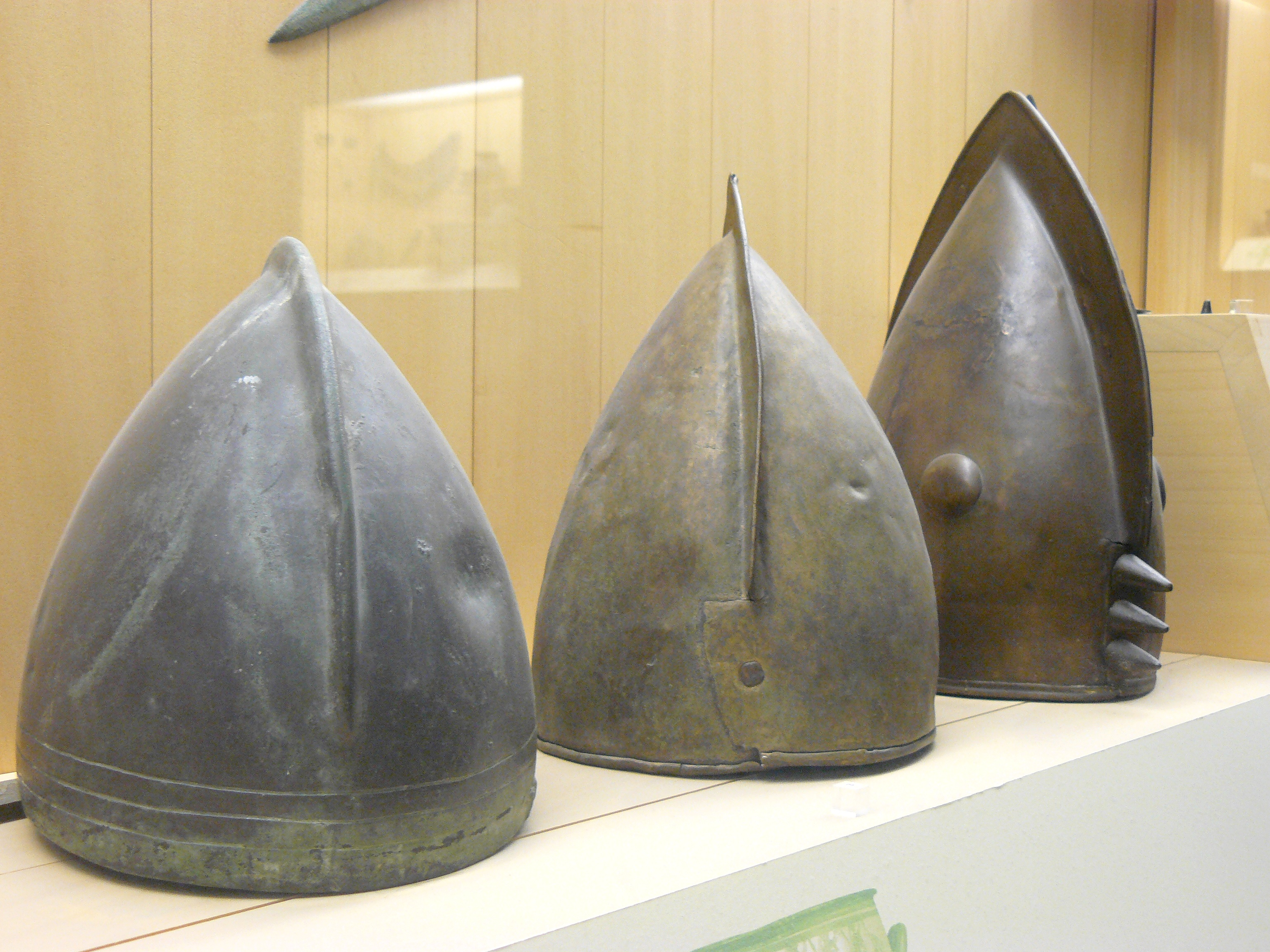
Crest helmets, 1150-950 BC

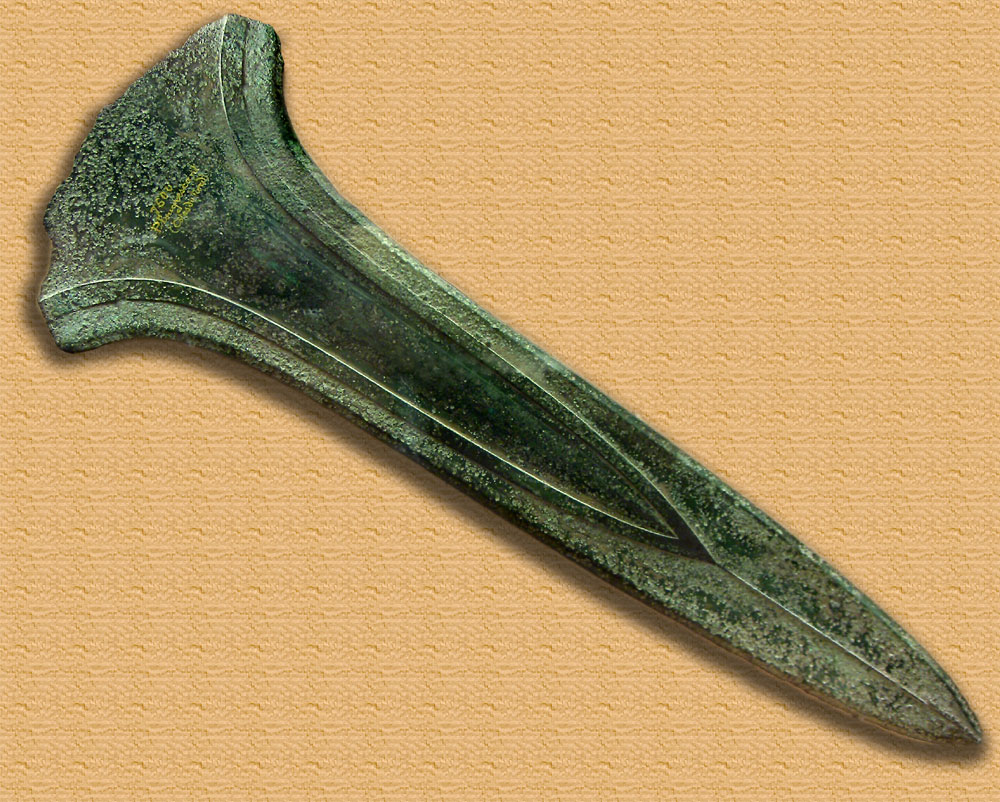
Bronze sword, circa 800 BC

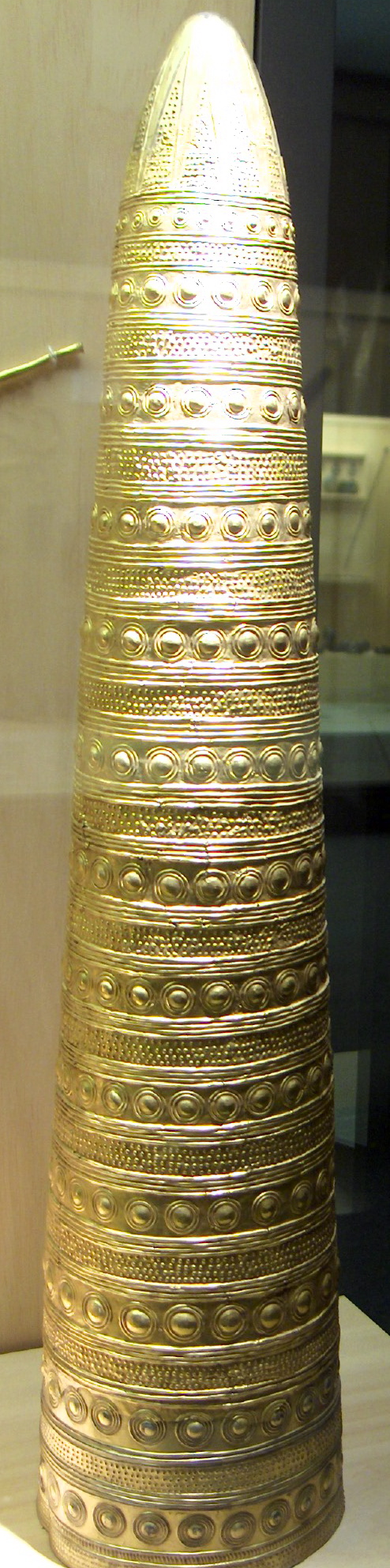
Avanton Gold Cone

=== Iron Age ===
The first Iron Age (780-480 BC), corresponding to the Hallstatt culture, is a period characterised by the burial in tumulus of the privileged.

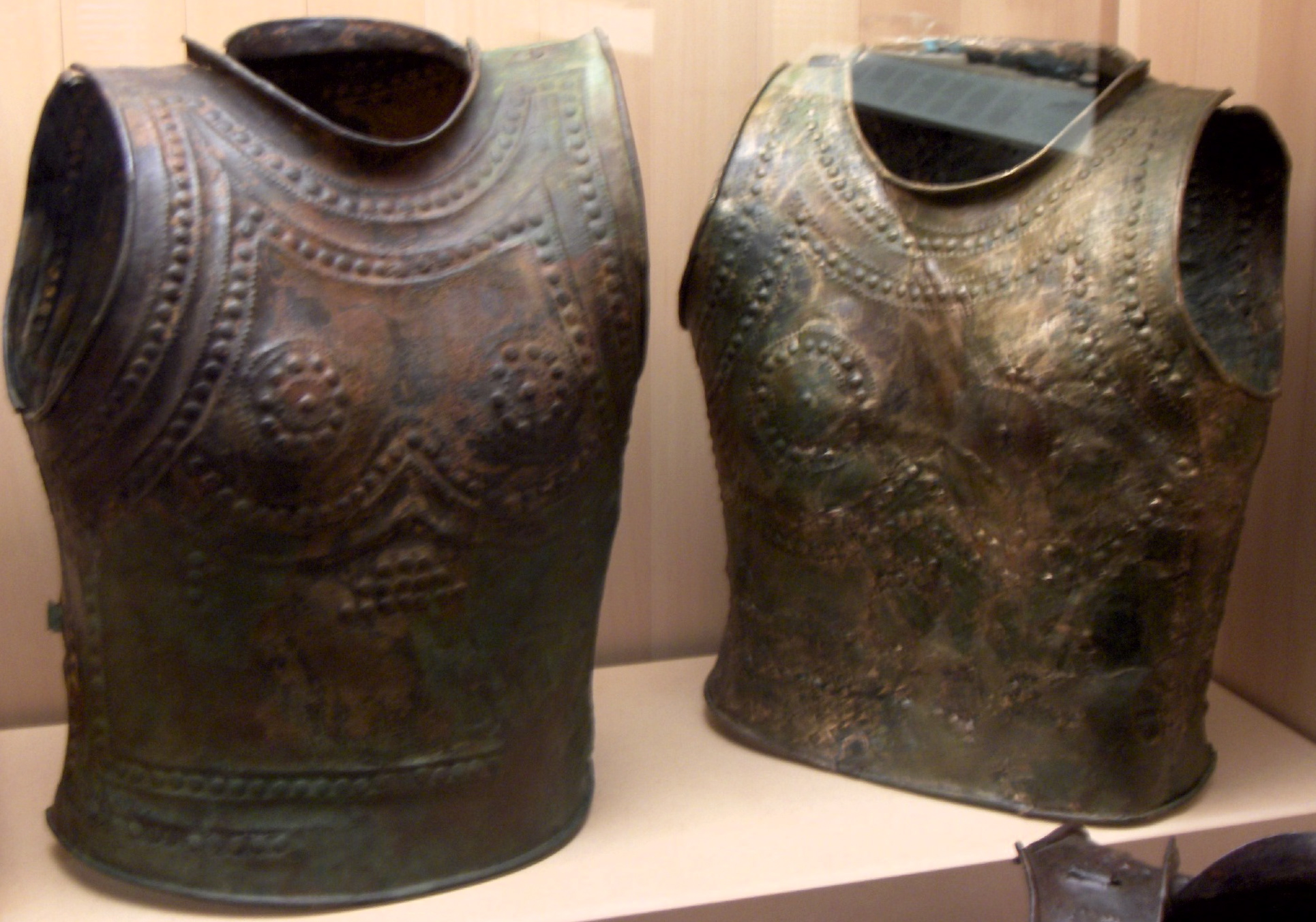
Bronze breastplates, each composed of two shells, rivetted together on one side and closed with a hook on the other, illustrating the evolution from bronze to iron working (circa 950 BC to 780 BC).

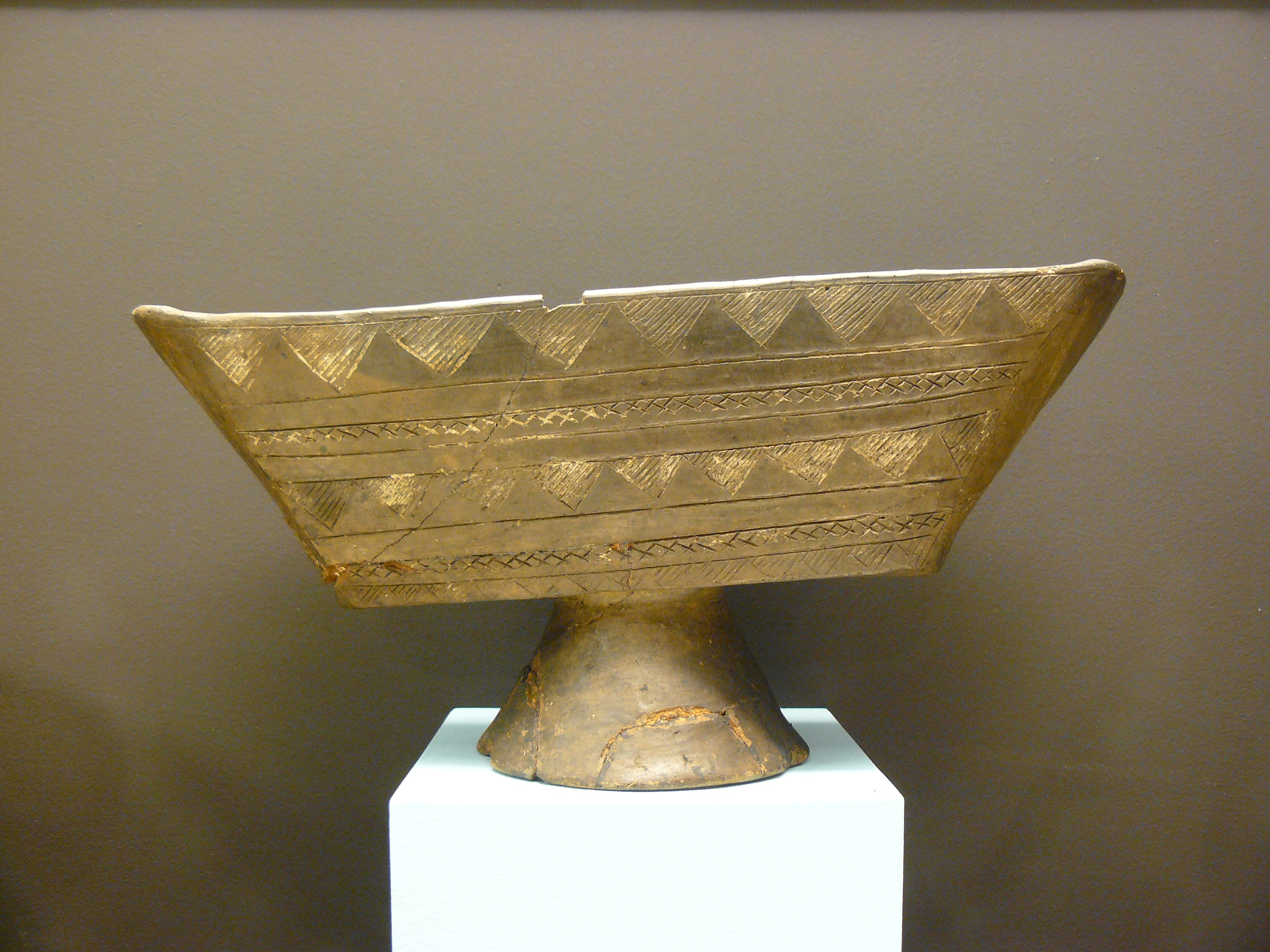
Terracotta cup (Golasecca culture), middle of the 8th century BC

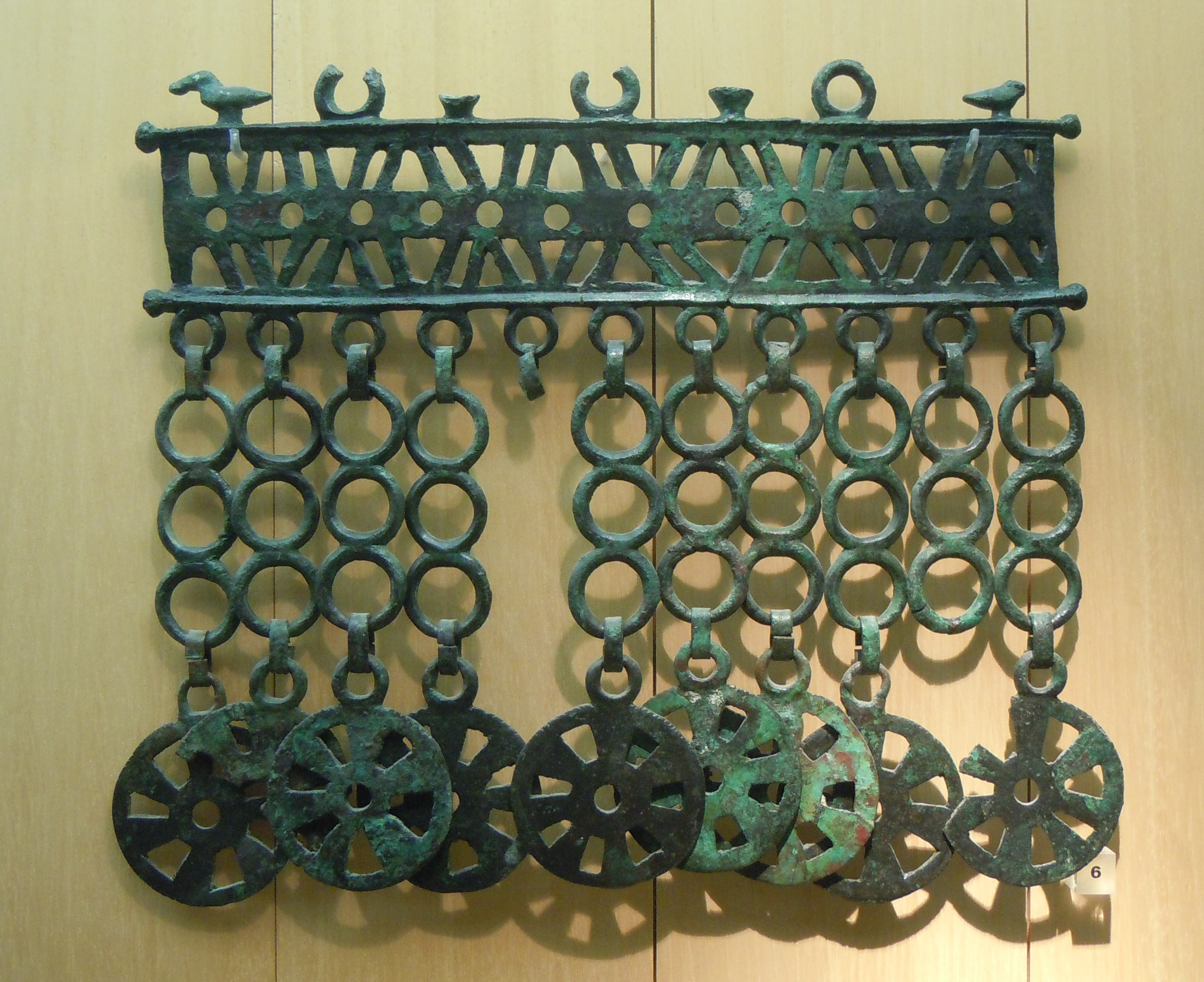
Pectoral ornament 6th century BC

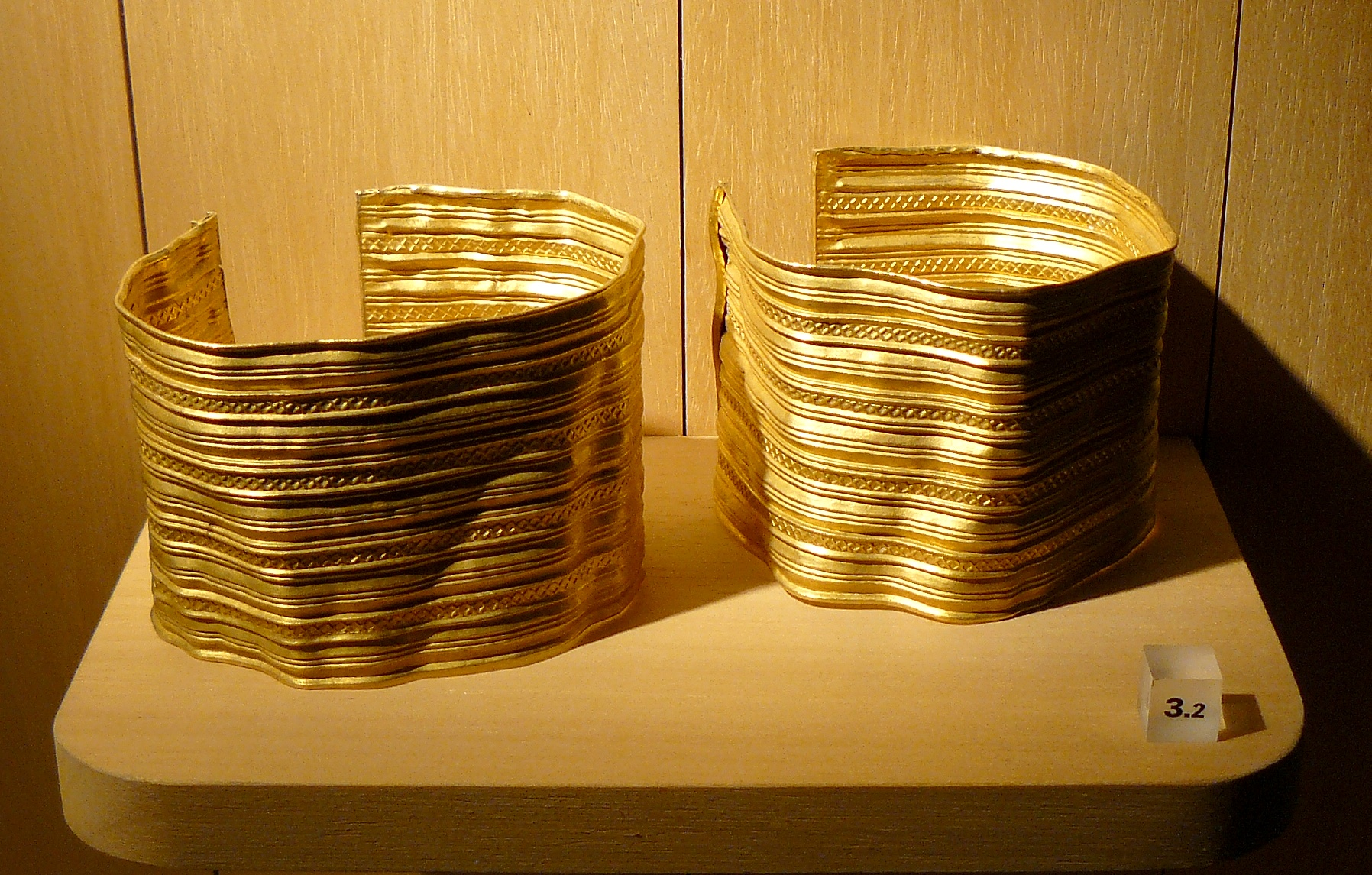
Gold bracelets, found in a Chariot burial, 6th, 5th century BC.

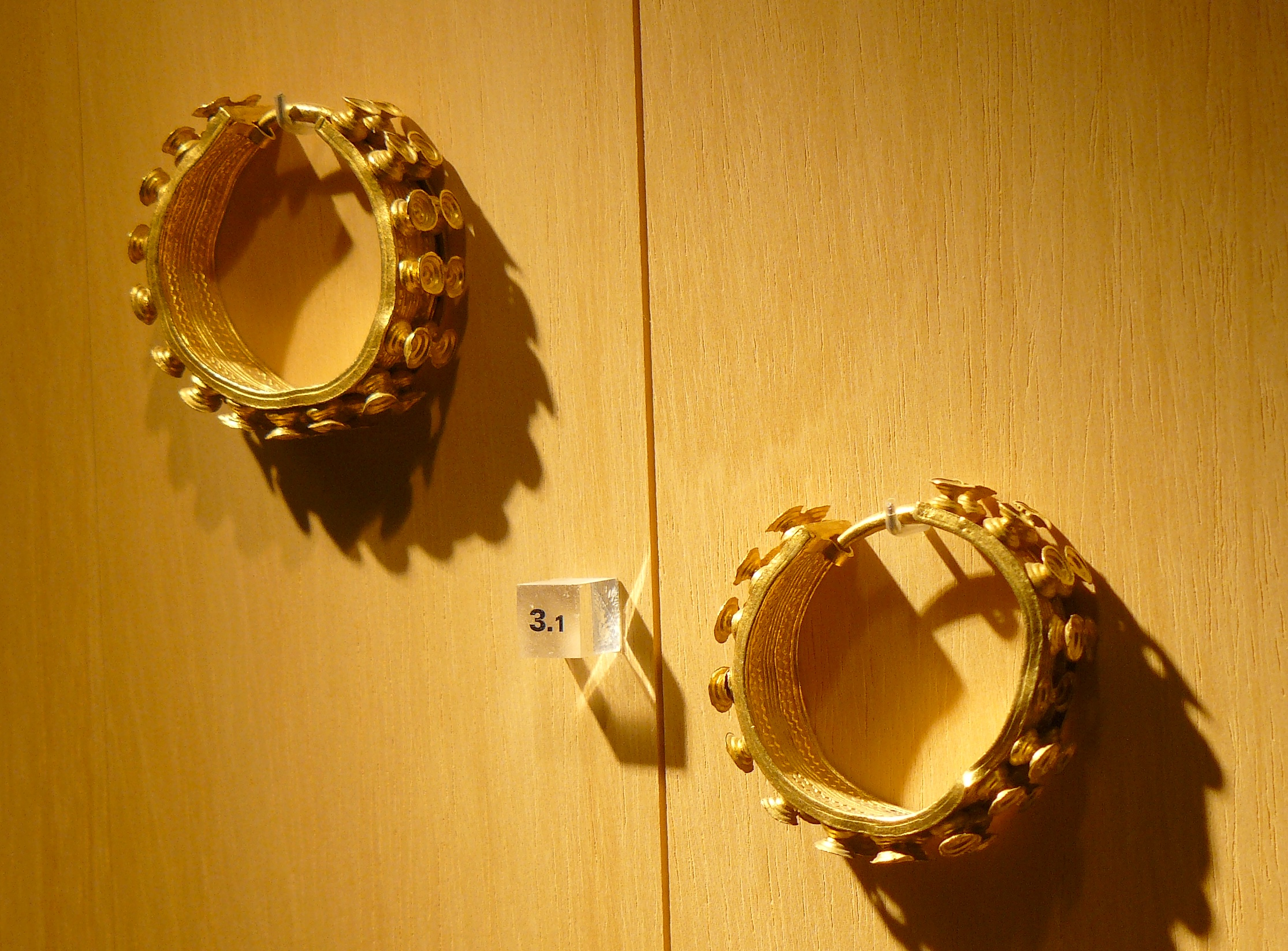
Gold earrings - 6th, 5th century BC.

The second Iron Age (480 BC - beginning of our era) is marked by a warlike society which rises in power from the fifth century BC to the 2nd century BC. The Gauls excel in pottery, glassware, metallurgy (bronze and iron).

The museum's collections show the transformations of Gaul and the life of the Gauls before the Roman conquest. The collection of Celtic art is one of the most important in the world.

=== Roman Gaul ===
Roman Gaul (from 52 BC to the end of the 5th century AD): as a result of the conquest of Gaul by Julius Caesar, Gaul is integrated into the Roman Empire. Urbanization is advancing with the arrival of cities and the construction of public buildings; A road network is formed throughout Gaul.

The six rooms of the Gallo-Roman department presents evidence of the religious context (gods, the world of the dead), the presence of the Roman army in Gaul, the different types of crafts and everyday life objects (related to food, costume, ornament, transportation, writing ...).

=== Merovingian Gaul ===
The first Middle Age (from the 5th to the 6th century AD) began with the Merovingian dynasty, founded by Clovis I. Gaul became progressively more Frankish and Christian. One material witness to this Christianisation held by the museum is the syncretistic 7th-century Grésin plaque, believed to depict an ithyphallic Christ. From this period, numerous cloisonné jewels were found with garnets set in metallic partitions, as well as buckles of damascened belts with silver or brass threads inserted in iron engraved furrows.

=== Comparative archeology ===
Archaeologist sometimes calls on other human sciences such as ethnology or sociology to interpret the traces of the past. It is in this spirit that the "comparative archeology of the five continents room" was conceived at the beginning of the twentieth century by Henri Hubert and Marcel Mauss who wanted to illustrate "the ethnographic history of Europe and humanity" from the origins of man up to the Middle Ages. Hubert conceived the general plan of this room according to two innovative ideas for the period:

As a sociologist, he believed that only a global (spatial and temporal) vision of human cultures can lead to a proper understanding of the social phenomenon;
For him, the comparison of the traces of human societies must be done according to a presentation of their technics.

This comparative approach was popular in the nineteenth and twentieth centuries, although some comparisons did not survive a severe criticism (for example, the comparison of Magdalenian shoes with the Eskimos), but the comparative method, which was rigorously conceived and subjected under certain conditions, is omnipresent in any archaeological approach. It is also a necessity to situate the ancient cultural phenomena in their space, to leave the limits of French territory and a nationalist approach.

At the National Archeology Museum, this approach has resulted in two overlapping axes of presentation:

On one axis of the room the technical stages are evoked in order of appearance from the Paleolithic to the Middle Ages: stone technics, terracotta work, metallurgy. On the cross-cutting axes a geographical section is presented: Africa, Asia, the Near East, Europe, Americas and Oceania. This course highlights the similarities and differences in the evolution of cultures in different regions of the world. The present presentation is inherited from that made by Hubert between 1910 and 1927 but the route was renovated between 1978 and 1984.

The visitor makes successively acquaintance with the Palaeolithic and Neolithic cultures of Africa (Maghreb, South Africa, Ethiopia, Benin, Congo, Côte d'Ivoire, Zaire, etc.), then to the birth of the civilizations of the Mediterranean basin and the Middle East (pre-dynastic Egypt, ancient Susa, Bulgarian Thrace). Then he can compare the development and technical mastery of Bronze and Iron metalworkers in the Caucasus and Europe (objects from Cyprus, Greece, Italy, Spain, Hungary, Germany, Denmark, Sweden, Azerbaijan, North Ossetia, etc.). From one continent to another and sometimes at different times, the exhibits show a similar state of development (transition from hunter-gatherer to producer), use of the same technique (Exploitation of flint or obsidian) or, on the contrary, very different forms or settings (Asia-America comparison, made possible by objects from China, Vietnam, Japan, Malaysia, Peru, Greenland, North America, etc.).

The majority of the collection entered before the First World War. The first contribution was the Scandinavian collection offered in 1862 by Frederick VII of Denmark. The other major collections arrived through Ernest Chantre for the series of the Caucasus or Jacques and Henri de Morgan with the products of their excavations in Susa (modern day Iran) and in the pre-dynastic necropolis of Egypt

Since 2014, the room is once again home to collections of Pacific origin, with the presentation of ethnographic series from Papua New Guinea.

The comparative archeology room is located in the old ballroom of the castle, also called the room of Mars.

== Visitors ==
The number of annual visitors from 2003 to 2014 were:

- 61,759 in 2003
- 64,775 in 2004
- 65,925 in 2005
- 78,250 in 2006
- 98,246 in 2007
- 110,197 in 2008 (experimentation with free admission for half of the year)
- 91,894 in 2009
- 95,594 in 2010
- 92,266 in 2011
- 98,691 in 2012
- 101,222 in 2013
- 113,023 in 2014

== Sources ==
- "Eugène Millet (1819–1879)" (PDF) (in French). Société des Amis du Musée d'Archéologie nationale et du château de Saint-Germain-en-Laye. Archived from the original (PDF) on 2021-08-30.
- "Fréquentation des musées en France en 2007 (par région et département)". Veille Info Tourisme. Direction des musées de France, ministère de la culture. 2008-09-23. Archived from the original on 2010-03-14.
- "Histoire du musée" (in French). Musée d'archéologie nationale. Archived from the original on 2015-11-18.
- Leniaud, Jean-Michel (2015). "MILLET Eugène" (in French). École nationale des chartes, Sorbonne.
- Pioda, S. (March 2012). "Les Gaulois à l'origine du musée d'archéologie nationale". Archéologia (497).
- Volait, Mercedes (2006). "Arthur-Ali Rhoné (1836-1910) – Du Caire ancien au Vieux-Paris ou le patrimoine au prisme de l'érudition dilettante". Socio-anthropologie (in French). 19.
