= History of the Caucasus =

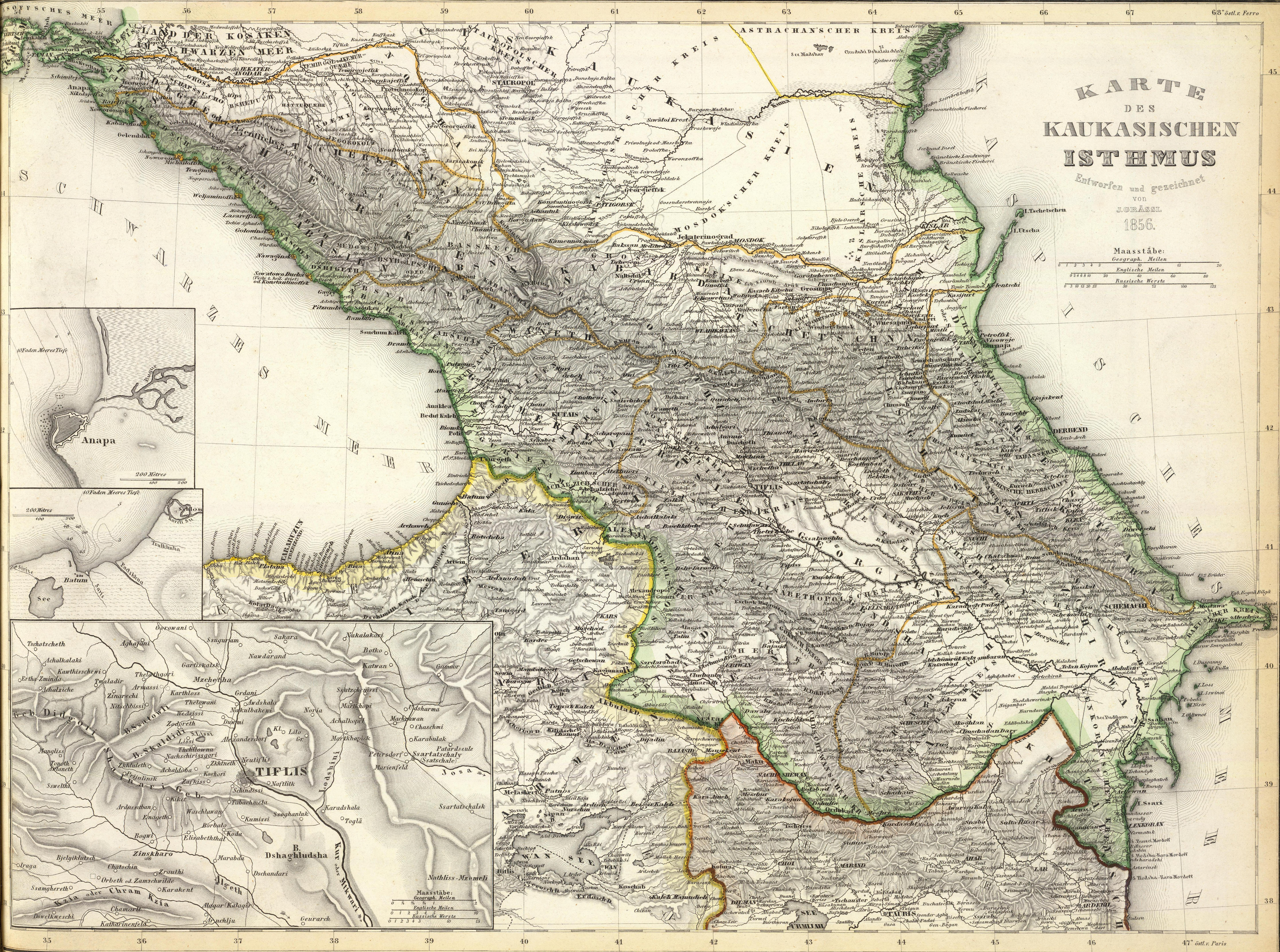
An 1856 map of the Caucasus region and surrounding areas, Bibliographisches Institut

Throughout history, Southern Caucasus and the Southeastern portion of the North Caucasus have come under the control of various empires, including the Achaemenid, Neo-Assyrian Empire, Parthian, Roman, Sassanian, Byzantine, Mongol, Ottoman, Iranian and Russian Empires. Starting in the late 1700s, Russia gained strong foothold in the region upon invitation of Georgia, which was seeking assistance against Islamic invasions. After establishing itself in the southern portion of the region, the Russian Empire subsequently conquered and annexed North Caucasus through the Caucasian Wars (1817–1864).

The North Caucasus became the scene of intense fighting during the Second World War. Nazi Germany attempted to capture the Caucasus region of Soviet Union in 1942 by a two-pronged attack towards both the western bank of the Volga (intended to seize the city of Stalingrad) and southeast towards Baku, a major center of oil production. Some parts of the North Caucasus fell under German occupation, but the Axis invasion eventually faltered as it failed to accomplish either goal, and Soviet soldiers drove the Germans back west following the Battle of Stalingrad (1942–1943).

Following the dissolution of the Soviet Union at the end of the Cold War, Armenia, Azerbaijan, and Georgia became independent nations. The Caucasus region has become the setting of territorial disputes in the post-Soviet era, which lead to the establishment of unrecognized states of Artsakh, Abkhazia, and South Ossetia.

== Early history ==
The Caucasus region gradually enters the historical record during the Late Bronze Age to Early Iron Age. Hayasa-Azzi was a Late Bronze Age confederation of two kingdoms of Armenian Highlands, Hayasa located South of Trabzon and Azzi, located north of the Euphrates and to the south of Hayasa. The Hayasa-Azzi confederation was in conflict with the Hittite Empire in the 14th century BC, leading up to the collapse of Hatti around 1190 BC.

Arme-Shupria was a kingdom, known from Assyrian sources beginning in the 13th century BC, located in what is now known as the Armenian Highlands, to the southwest of Lake Van, bordering on Ararat proper. The capital was called Ubbumu. The Diauehi were a tribal confederation in northeastern Anatolia in the post-Hittite period, mentioned in Urartian inscriptions. Diauehi is a possible locus of Proto-Kartvelian; it has been described as an "important tribal formation of possible proto-Georgians" by Ronald Grigor Suny (1994), although other scholars have suggested that it may have been proto-Armenian (based on the etymology of the name). At the same time, during the 13th to 9th centuries BC, the Nairi appear in Assyrian and Hittite records. The Battle of Nihriya (c. 1230 BC) was the culmination of Hittite-Assyrian hostilities.

The Kingdom of Urartu rose to power in the mid-9th century BC and flourished for two centuries before it was absorbed into the Median Empire in the early 6th century BC, followed by the conquest by the Achaemenid Empire, leading to Urartu becoming the Satrapy of Armenia, Armenia being synonymous with Urartu and vice versa.

The Northern Caucasus enters the historical record later, being in cultural contact with the Pontic steppe. The Koban culture (ca. 1100 to 400 BC) is a late Bronze Age and Iron Age culture of the northern and central Caucasus. Its end presumably correlates with the Scythian expansion in the region.

== Middle Ages ==
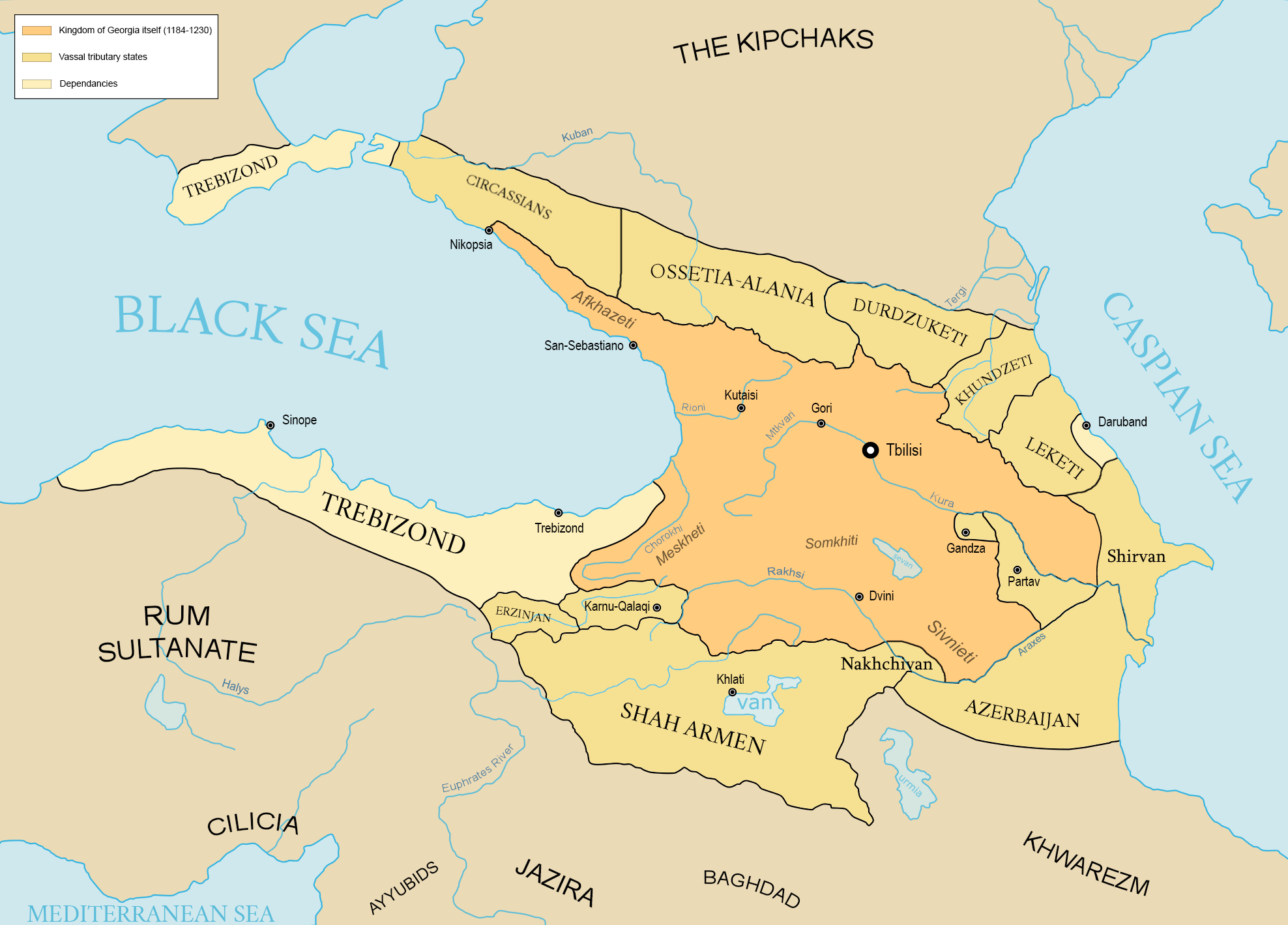
Kingdom of Georgia at the peak of its power under Tamar of Georgia and George IV of Georgia (1184– 1226).

During the Middle Ages, Georgia was fought over between the Sassanids and the Byzantines in the Iberian War and the Lazic War before falling under Ummayad suzerainty. Arabic domination of Georgia was replaced by several independent Georgian principalities. The kingdom of Georgia was formed after Bagrat III of Georgia united the Kingdom of Abkhazia and the Kingdom of Tao klarjeti trough dynastic successions. Georgia experienced a renaissance under the rule of Bagrat IV and his successors, notably the female king Tamar I, who defeated invading muslim powers at the battles of Didgori, Shamkori and Basiani. At its peak, Georgia included All of modern Georgia, modern Armenia, eastern azerbaijan, northeasternmost turkey and a strip of the russian coast on the black sea, stretching from the Greater Caucasus and Nikopsia in the north to Araxes to the south. Its tributaries, vassalz and spheres of influence included the city states of Ganja, Erzurum, Erzincan and Daruband, as well as the Kingdom of Shirvan, adarbadagan, Trapezuntine empire, Ossetia, Dzurdzuks, Lezgins and Shah-Armenid Kingdom, among others. The Khwarezmian and Mongol invasions of the country put an end to the golden age; however, It experienced a brief period of restoration under George V of Georgia before another turco-mongol invasions, this time led by Tamerlane, weakened the centralized authority.. It finally collapsed in 1490 as a result of internal instability and was divided in three kingdoms and one principality.

Bagratid Armenia, Zakarid Armenia, Kingdom of Tashir-Dzoraget, Kingdom of Syunik, Principality of Hamamshen, Kingdom of Artsakh, its successors (Principality of Khachen, Meliktoms of Artsakh, and Melikdom of Kashatagh) and many more Armenian principalities organized the local Armenian population facing multiple threats after the fall of the antique Kingdom of Armenia.

Bagratid Armenia and the local kingdoms it was made up of during 1000 AD

Caucasian Albania maintained close ties with Armenia, and the Church of Caucasian Albania shared the same Christian dogmas with the Armenian Apostolic Church and had a tradition of their Catholicos being ordained through the Patriarch of Armenia.

== Early modern history ==
Map of the Caucasus in 1490

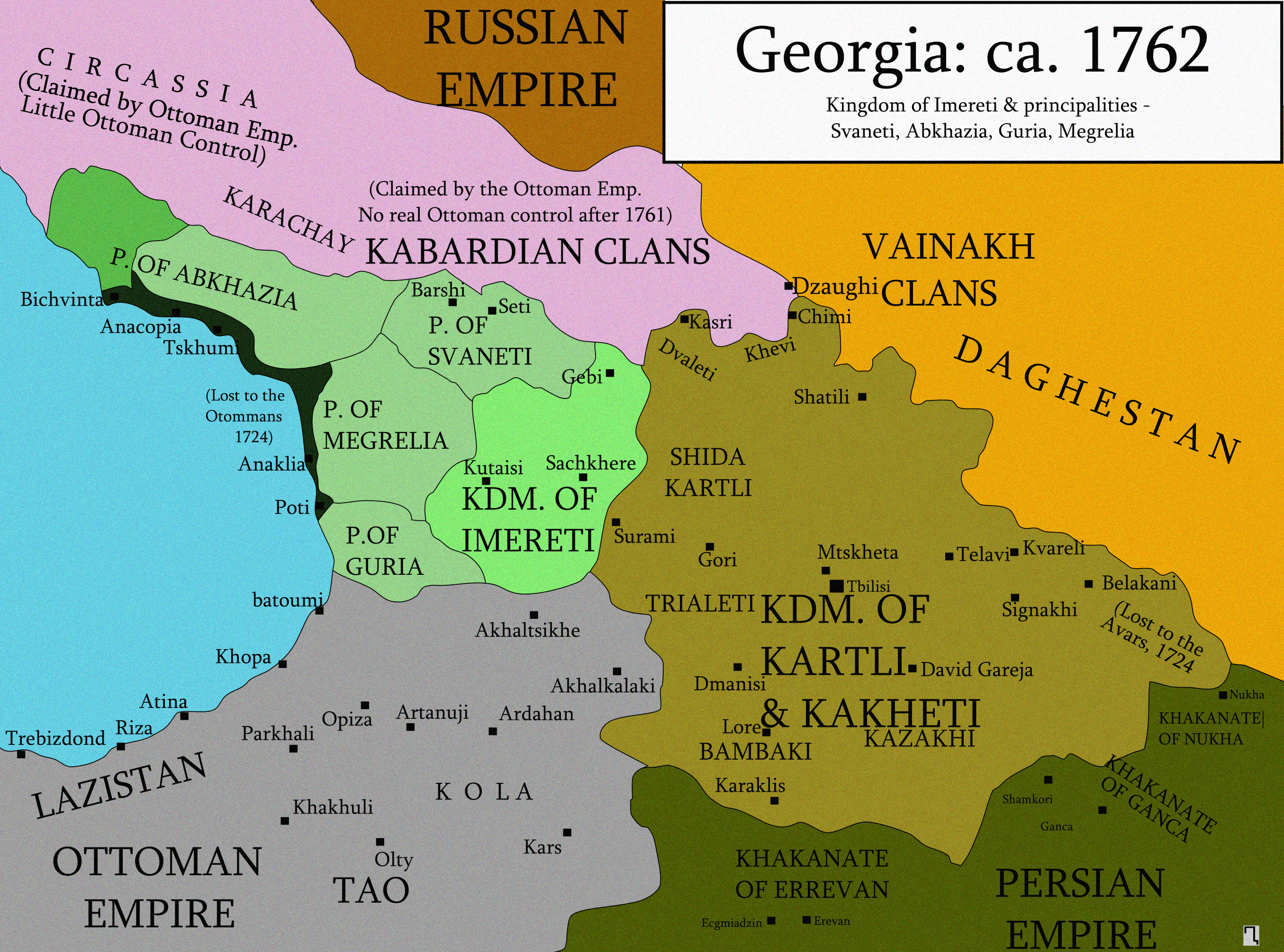
The Kingdom of Kartli-Kakheti in 1762

By the end of the 15th century, the Kingdom of Georgia was fragmented into a number of petty client kingdoms subject to either Persia (Kingdom of Kakheti, Kingdom of Kartli) or the Ottomans (Kingdom of Imereti). (Note: From 1258, Imereti was considered a separate kingdom within the Kingdom of Georgia (1008–1490). However, the start of the rule of the Second House of Imereti in 1455 is from where it became independent from the Kingdom of Georgia and would form its definite own entity.) Throughout the 16th century, the Caucasus continued to serve as a battleground between Persian and Ottoman forces, with the two great powers attempting to gain control over the region. From the 1530s to the 1550s, several Transcaucasian cities became the focal point of these imperial divides. In 1555, this culminated in the Peace of Amasya, whereby Ottoman and Persian forces agreed to establish formal spheres of influence in the region. As a result of the Treaty, the Safavid Empire (Persia) assumed control over lands East of the Surami Highlands, including the Georgian kingdoms of Kartli and Kakheti. The Ottomans received areas West of the Highlands, including the Georgian kingdom of Imereti. The nascent Russian Empire gained territories in the North Caucasus in the Russo-Persian war of 1722/3. These territories were ceded back to Persia a few years later. Following the death of Nader Shah, Kartli and Kakheti were merged into the Kingdom of Kartli-Kakheti in 1762; Erekle de facto seceded from Persian overlordship, but still de jure recognized the Persians as his suzerain. In 1783, King Erekle II concluded the Treaty of Georgievsk with the Russian Empire. Catherine the Great tried to use Georgia as a base of operations against both Iran and the Ottoman Empire. After her death, the Russians withdrew to the North Caucasus Line. The Qajar dynasty re-established Persia's traditional suzerainty over the Caucasus. A Persian invasion force defeated the Georgian army in the Battle of Krtsanisi in 1795. In 1801, a few years after the assassination of Agha Mohammad Khan, capitalizing on the eruption of instability in Iran, the Russians annexed eastern Georgia (Kartli-Kakheti).

While Georgia and Armenia remained Christian, the Chechens gradually adopted Sunni Islam. The Circassians were mostly Islamized under the influence of the Crimean Tatars and the Ottoman Empire in the 17th century.

== Modern history ==
=== Russian Empire and Civil War ===
- Georgia within the Russian Empire (1801 – 1918)
  - Russo-Persian War (1804 – 13)
  - Treaty of Kurakchay (1805)
  - Treaty of Gulistan (1813)
  - Russo-Persian War (1826–28)
  - Treaty of Turkmenchay (1828)
  - Caucasian War (1817 – 1864)
  - Circassian genocide
  - Caucasus Campaign
- Russian Civil War
  - Volunteer Army (1918 – 1920)
  - Kuban People's Republic (1918 – 1920)
  - Mountainous Republic of the Northern Caucasus (1917 – 1922)
- Democratic Republic of Georgia (1918 – 1921)
- Transcaucasian Democratic Federative Republic

=== Soviet Union ===
- Soviet Union
  - Transcaucasian Socialist Federative Soviet Republic
  - Armenian Soviet Socialist Republic
  - Georgian Soviet Socialist Republic
  - Azerbaijan Soviet Socialist Republic
- First Nagorno-Karabakh War (1988 – 1994)
- Ossetian-Ingush conflict (1989 – 1991)
- Chechen Republic of Ichkeria (1991 – 2000)
- Republic of Georgia (since 1991)
- Republic of Armenia (since 1991)
- Republic of Azerbaijan (since 1991)

=== Recent history (1991–present) ===
- War in Abkhazia (1992–1993)
- First Chechen War, 1994 – 1996
- Second Chechen War, 1999 – 2006
- Russo-Georgian War, 2008
- 2020 Nagorno-Karabakh War

== See also ==
- Caucasus Greeks
- North Caucasus
- South Caucasus
- History of Georgia (country)
- History of Armenia
- History of Azerbaijan
- History of Abkhazia
- History of Chechnya
- History of Nagorno-Karabakh
- History of Nakhchivan
- Southern Russia
- Eastern Magyars
- North Caucasian Huns
- Huns
- Khazars
- Western Turkic Khaganate
