= Landelinus buckle =

7th-century Merovingian belt buckle

External image
- Photograph of the Landelinus buckle with a close-up of the head of the horseman via Friedrich (2023).

The Landelinus buckle or Ladoix-Serrigny buckle is a 7th-century Merovingian belt buckle uncovered in Ladoix-Serrigny, France. The belt buckle is a notable example of early Christian iconography in Merovingian Burgundy, conjectured to depict an apocalyptic Christ on horseback. The buckle bears a Latin inscription identifying its creator as Landelinus, conjecturally identified by one scholar with Saint Landelin.

== Discovery ==
In spring of 1971, during construction work in a Burgundian vineyard at Ladoix-Serrigny, the vineyard's owner, Christian Perrin, uncovered an ancient graveyard, in use at least since the 4th century AD, with burials stretching from the Late Roman Empire to the Merovingian period. The Landelinus buckle was found in one destroyed Merovingian grave. In this grave was also found leather remains, a knife, and a scramasax.

The graveyard has not yet been thoroughly investigated and the grave-finds surrounding the buckle have been lost. Though the buckle has been discussed in print continuously since 1971, archaeologists were not able to study it in detail until 1996–97, when Henri Gaillard de Sémainville, then Director of Historical Antiquities for Burgundy, obtained permission from Perrin. The vineyard owners were still in possession of the buckle as of 2019.

== Description and interpretation ==
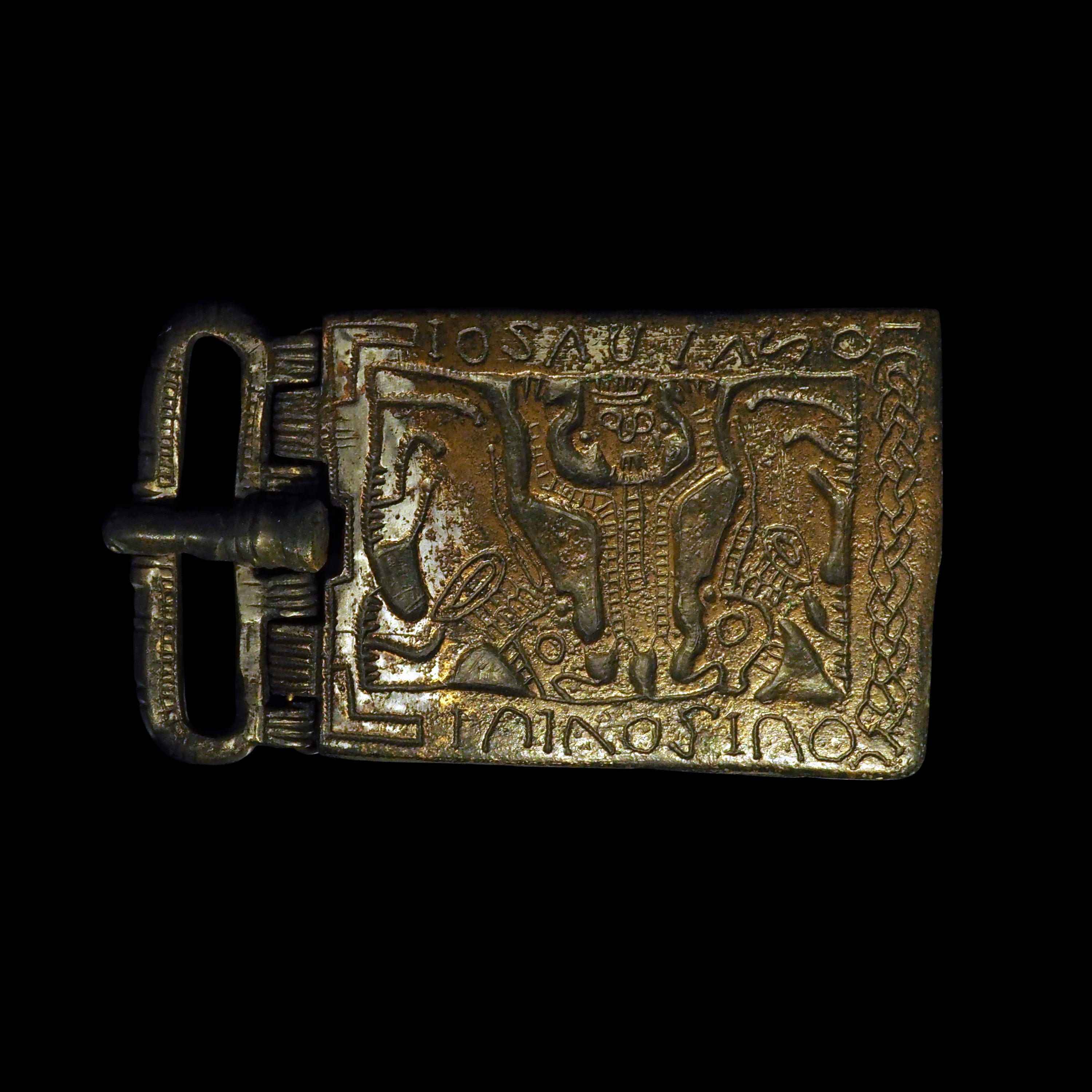
Another Burgundian "type D" belt buckle with Christian imagery. This belt buckle depicts the biblical figure Daniel having his feet licked by lions.

The belt buckle is made of bronze and the incisings are shallow. According to Bailey K. Young, among Germanic peoples belt buckles often served as "sites of prominent personal display", and in this case "a fashion for consciously Christian imagery." This particular buckle belongs to the family of Burgundian plate-buckles classified by Max Martin as "type D": such buckles are cast in bronze with decorated plates, are often found as part of elite Burgundian burials, and are generally dated between the later 6th century and to the 7th. The Landelinus buckle has been dated to the 7th century on this basis. Several other type D buckles with Christian imagery have been found in the region, many with depictions of the biblical figure Daniel. The Burgundian who wore this belt buckle also wore a scramasax, so we can conclude the owner was an elite male. Its creator was clearly educated: he knew Latin and perhaps even scripture; this contrasts with the engraving, which has been described as "childish" (Note: Original French: "puéril".) and "simplistically rendered".

On the buckle, a bearded horseman with rays emanating from his head (perhaps hair or a halo) sits atop his horse. Arms raised and elbows bent, the horseman brandishes a spear (or lance) in his left hand and an axe in his right. The horse is elongated and with a small, fanged mouth, rendered in such a way as has been described as "serpentine". The horse's erect penis is on prominent display. To the left of the rider is small, long, four-legged creature (perhaps a dragon or bird). To the right of the rider and above the horse's head is a chi-rho, flanked by an alpha and an omega. Below the horse's mouth is a greek cross. The tongue of the belt buckle displays a simpler chi-rho (an X with a horizontal line through it).

Below the figures a Latin text is inscribed:

Latin

LANDELINVS FICIT
NVMEN
QVI ILLA PVSSEDIRAVIT VIVA[T]
VSQVI ANNVS MILI IN D[OMIN]O (Note: Sometimes instead glossed as D[E]O, hence "thousandth year of God".)

English (after Michael Friedrich)

Landelinus made this
deity.
Whoever possesses these things, may he live
until the thousandth year of the Lord.

The Latin word numen is difficult to interpret; here it is translated as "deity", but it can otherwise mean "divine will" or "divine presence". Gaillard de Sémainville notes that numen was often used by Christians to designate Christ. He translates the phrase as "Landelinus has made (a representation of) the Divinity". (Note: Original French: "Landelinus a fait (une représentation de) la Divinité".) However, Gaillard de Sémainville admits, numen can also be meant to "designate the object itself, an artefact provided with divine, indeed magic, powers". For example, Rainer Warland has argued that given the use of ficit (fecit, literally, "made"), Christ is unlikely, and numen should be read to mean "divine guardian spirit". Another thing to note is the implicit millenarism (that is, belief that the end of times would come in 1000 AD) of the inscription. Such a view had been unfashionable in the Western Church since St. Augustine criticised it.

Cécile Treffort and Henri Gaillard de Sémainville both read these figures as representing Christ of the Apocalypse on horseback. The figure is Christ upon the white horse, the rays from his head represent a halo. To his right are symbols of God and salvation, and to his left is the Beast. Gaillard de Sémainville, however, has gone further to insist that the creator of the buckle "drew with great originality on various scriptural as well as iconographic traditions in rendering sometimes surprising details", drawing analogies between particular verses of the Book of Revelation and artistic choices in the buckle. Michael Friedrich finds the identification of the figure with Christ "not as clear", citing as evidence Rainer Warland's interpretation of numen. Friedrich reads the "halo" as merely an attempt at rendering hair. The buckle also exhibits some pagan syncretism. The erect penis and fangs of the horse are described by Young as religiously ambiguous "symbol[s] of vitality and power". Gaillard de Sémainville has drawn explicit analogy between the figures such sources as the ithyphallic figure (supposed to be Christ) in the pagan-Christian Grésin plaque.

Another remarkable fact about the buckle is that it mentions its author's name, "Landelinus". This is very uncommon among Merovingian belt buckles. Italian scholar Paolo Serra suggested that perhaps this Landelinus was identifiable with the ill-recorded 7th-century Frankish Saint Landelin. Landelinus has prefaced his name with a cross (suggesting he was a member of the clergy) and Gaillard de Sémainville's profile of the author (learned in Latin and scripture, unlearned in art) fits the saint quite well. However, such an identification raises questions, such as why a member of the Western Church was proffering millenarist beliefs.

== See also ==
- Maschen disc brooch
- Pforzen buckle
