= Raymond Lantier =

French archaeologist and museum curator

Raymond François Lantier (11 July 1886, Lisieux – 2 April 1980, Le Vésinet) was a 20th-century French archaeologist.

== Biography ==
He has researched and studied the Visigoth cemetery of Estagel (Pyrénées-Orientales), Spain and Tunisia, in particular participating in the excavations of Carthage.

He was assistant curator in 1926, then Chief curator from 1933 to 1956, of the National Archaeological Museum at Saint-Germain-en-Laye. Meanwhile, he officiated as a professor of national and prehistoric antiquities in the École du Louvre.

A member of the Académie des Inscriptions et Belles-Lettres from 1946 until his death, Raymond Lantier was also a member of the Comité des travaux historiques et scientifiques. He was officier of the Legion of Honour and of the Ordre des Palmes Académiques.

== Selected bibliography ==
- Leroi-Gourhan, André (1981). "Raymond Lantier (1886–1980)". Gallia préhistoire. Vol. 24 fascicule 2. p. 269.
- Duval, Paul-Marie (1981). "Raymond Lantier (1886-1980)". Gallia. Vol. 39 fascicule 1. pp. 1–2.
