= Bagrat IV =

Bagrat IV may refer to:

- Bagrat IV of Georgia, King in 1027–1072
- Bagrat (son of Prince Teimuraz of Imereti), King in 1589–1590
