= Moselkern stele =

Merovingian basalt monument

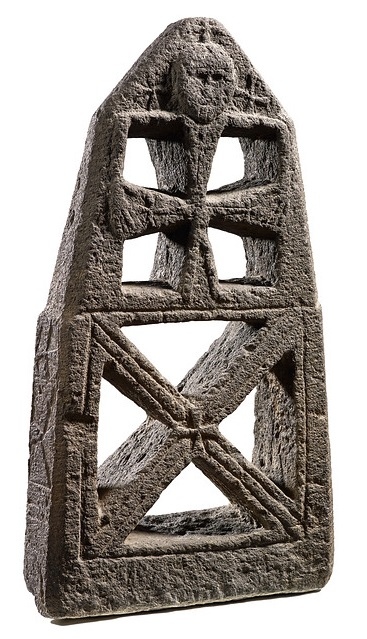
The front of the Moselkern stele.

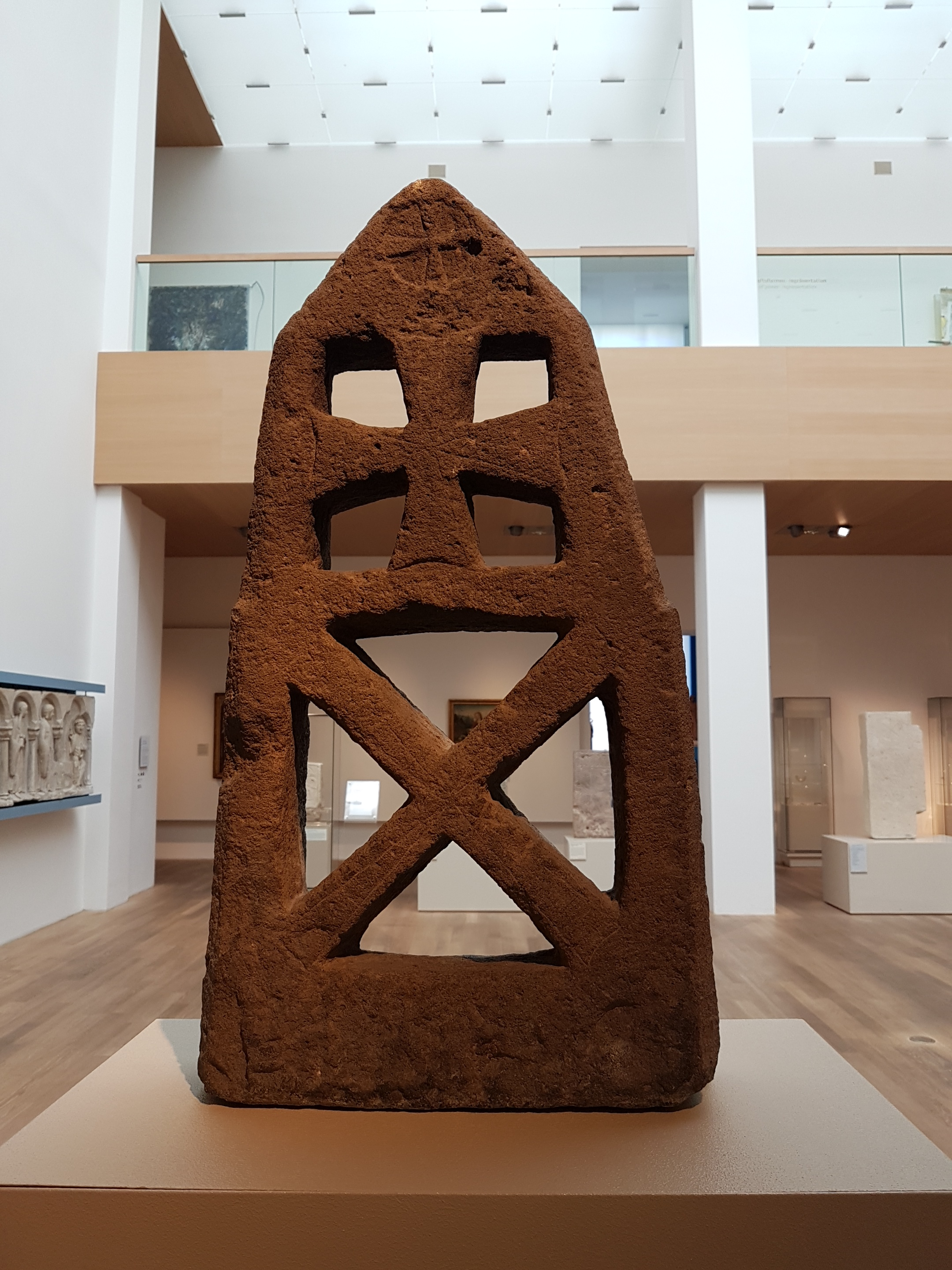
The back of the Moselkern stele.

The Moselkern stele is a Merovingian basalt monument with two openwork Christian crosses. The stele, which has been dated to the 7th century CE, was excavated from the cemetery of Moselkern, Germany around 1800. The upper cross of the stele is thought to show a crucified Christ in relief; if so, it is among the oldest sculptures of the crucifixion north of the Alps.

== Discovery and location ==
The stele was excavated from the cemetery of Moselkern around 1800, where it was thereafter placed. Moselkern lies at the mouth of the Elzbach, west of the Rhine. This region was, by the 7th century, already Christianised under the Franks.

The stele's historical value was not noticed until 1915. The stele is presently in the collection of Rheinisches Landesmuseum Bonn. Replicas of the stone were placed within the church and in the cemetery. An image of the stele has been on the coat of arms of the municipality since 1982.

== Description ==
The stele measures 80 cm by 44 cm by 14 cm and is made of Niedermendig basalt. The stele has been dated to the 7th century CE.

The shape of the stele is trapezoid, with a triangle gable on top. The original base of the stone is missing. The most prominent feature of the stele is two crosses embedded in square openwork. The lower cross is a diagonal cross. Incised horizontal and vertical lines frame the lower cross. All four arms have parallel lines are carved into them, which are interrupted in the centre by a small Greek cross. The upper cross is a Greek cross with arms which widen as in a Coptic ankh. A human figure is carved in relief on this cross. The figure's head is in the gable, above the upper arm of the cross; his arms (bent at the elbows) hang around the top of the openwork frame. His torso runs down the upper arm of the cross, his hip is in its centre, and his legs and feet (slender and much truncated) trace the lower arm of the cross. Two small Greek crosses flank the figure's hip and three small Greek crosses surround his head. The crosses besides the figure's hip seem to extend, like daggers, into his hip. The figure's head is disproportionately large, his eyes are deep set, and he is depicted with thick hair and a beard.

Shallowly carved Greek and Latin crosses decorate the reverse and sides. On the reverse, opposite Christ's head, is a circle relief into which is carved another Greek cross.

== Interpretation ==
Though decorated with an abundance of crosses, the stele was not immediately interpreted as a crucifixion, or even necessarily Christian. German art historian Wilhelm Albert von Jenny, for example, conjectured in 1935 that the cross was a syncretic monument, combining native Germanic and Christian symbols, and was pessimistic about the possibility of its interpretation. Historians Kurt Böhner and Hans Lehner, while admitting the stele as Christian, denied that it represented a crucifixion. For Lehner, the human figure was perhaps the deceased. Böhner thought the hand placement was incompatible with a crucifixion image. The figure does pose some difficulties. It seems to stand in front of the cross rather than being affixed to it. Art historian Lynda Coon has described the figure as "free-floating" and "struggling to pull his human form out of the funerary rock". The hanging arms, bent at the elbows, are an almost unknown stylistic choice if this is a crucifixion. They are incompatible with the traditional crucifixion pose, in which Jesus is nailed to the cross by his wrists or hands. Furthermore, the figure's stare is rendered with an intensity that hardly suggests a dying Jesus.

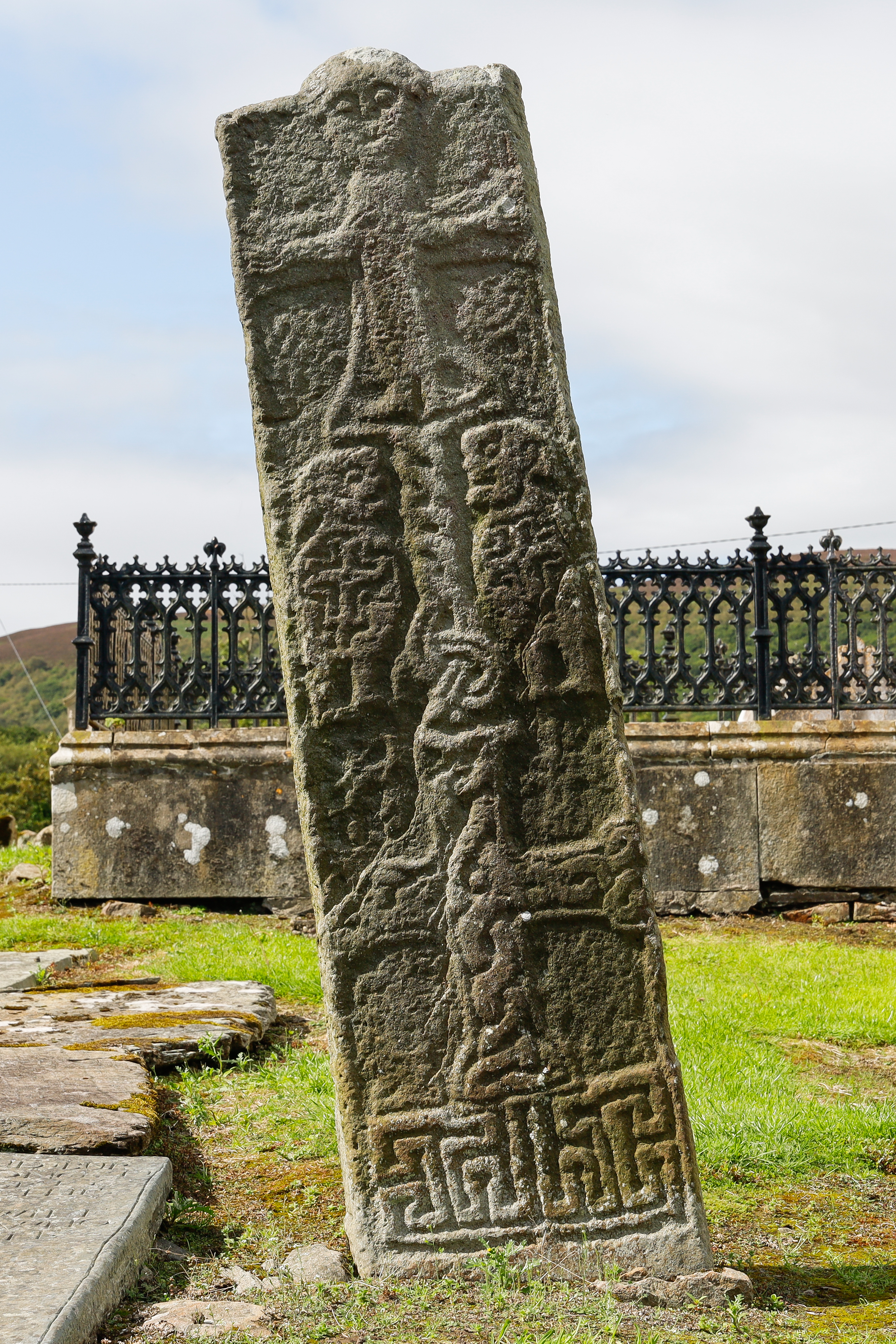
Art historian Victor H. Elbern has compared the Moselkern stele to such early medieval crucifixion reliefs as the Carndonagh stone.

Nonetheless, art historian Victor H. Elbern confidently identifies the figure with the crucified Jesus. The nimbus of three crosses surrounding the figure's head is a sure sign that the figure is a holy one, and not the deceased. In the early medieval period, the crucifixion (and more generally the passion of Christ) was not nearly as popular a subject as it would become later, so the peculiar treatment is to be understood. The figure can be compared to other early medieval depictions of the crucifixions, such as that on the (probably 9th or 10th century) Irish Carndonagh stone, which depict Christ as lively and standing during the crucifixion. The Carndonagh stone, in particular, also depicts Christ with a bulbous head and an intense stare. The comparison to Insular high crosses also troubles the identification of the monument as a gravestone. Many high crosses were erected in graveyards without necessarily being gravestones.

While Coptic and Insular analogues of (and likely, influences on) the stele can be found, the Moselkern stele is a valuable and unique material representative of Frankish Christianity in the 7th century. Elbern describes it as one of the earliest sculptures of Christ on the cross north of the Alps. It has also been appreciated for its art historical value. Elbern saw a unified design and sophisticated religious theme in the stele. Coon has described the stele as "present[ing] [Jesus as] a human figure overwhelmed by the stark geometry of the cross and by the cosmic proportions of a disembodied god", contrasting it thematically with the Christ image on the Niederdollendorf stone and the Hypogée des Dunes crucifixion relief.

== See also ==
- Basalt cross
- Hornhausen stones
- Niederdollendorf stone
