= Heinrich Pröhle =

Christoph Ferdinand Heinrich Pröhle (June 4, 1822 – May 28, 1895) was a German literary historian, teacher (Oberlehrer), writer and folk tale and fairy tale collector (a successor to the Brothers Grimm).

== Disambiguation of Heinrich ==
The given name "Heinrich" occurs in several cases among the relatives of the writer in question. As far as it is known, all the Pröhle are relatives, whether the family name is written with short Germanic umlaut or long Hungarian umlaut. (Note: Today the members of the Pröhle family reside in Budapest, Hungary.)

- Heinrich Andreas Pröhle (1797–1875), Lutheran pastor and poet in Hornhausen, Germany, the father of the writer
- Christoph Ferdinand Heinrich Pröhle (1822–1895), the writer
- Heinrich Prőhle (1870–1950), a well known pastor and theological professor of the Hungarian Lutherans in Pozsony (Preßburg or Bratislava) in Austria-Hungary, a cousin of the writer
- Heinrich Prőhle (?–?), director of a factory in Mosonmagyaróvár, later a special translator in Budapest, Hungary, the son of the pastor in Pozsony above
- Heinrich Prőhle (b. 1936), a professor at the Liszt Ferenc Academy of Music in Budapest, Hungary, the son of the translator above

== Life and career ==
- 1822: Heinrich Pröhle was born in Satuelle (then in Neuhaldensleben, Ohrekreis, German Confederation) as the son of the Lutheran pastor and hobby poet Heinrich Andreas Pröhle.
- 1843−1846: he studied history and German philology in Halle (1843–1845) and Berlin (1845/46).
- 1847/48: study tour in Southern Germany, Hungary, Upper Austria and Tyrol.
- 1848/49: political correspondent of the newspaper "Augsburgische Allgemeine Zeitung" in Wien.
- 1849: an early book, "Aus dem Kaiserstaat" (Wien).
- 1849−: independent writer in Berlin.
- 1851−: series of extended tale and legend collection tours in Harz.
- 1854−1857: his residence is moved to Wernigerode, close to the peak Brocken, a convenient base for the collection tours in Harz.
- 1855: Wilhelm Grimm and Karl Joseph Simrock promoted Heinrich Pröhle in Bonn (Friedrich Christoph Dahlmann was teaching there at the time), for his work on Brockensagen and the etymology of the names in Harz ("De Bructeri nominibus et de fabulis, quae ad eum montem pertinent").
- 1857–1890: teacher at a realschule in Berlin, 1858/59 in Mülheim at Ruhr.
- 1890: title "professor" was given at his retirement.
- 1895: he died in Steglitz near Berlin.

== Intellectual heritage ==
He became well known as a collector and publisher of German folk-tales and folk-legends. He was a German literary historian as well.

His intellectual heritage was recognised in several ways:

- he received the title "professor" at his retirement
- there is a street called Pröhleweg (Note: Pröhleweg in Berlin, since 1964) in Berlin-Spandau (very close to Potsdam), since 1 July 1964.

== Bibliography ==
- Berlin und Wien. Berlin 1850
- Der Pfarrer von Grünrode. Leipzig 1852
- Kinder- und Volksmärchen. Leipzig 1853, (collected about Oberharz mainly)
- Märchen für die jugend. Halle 1854
- Harzsagen. 1. Band, Leipzig 1853, 2. Band 1856
- Harzbilder. Sitten und Gebräuche aus dem Harzgebirge. Leipzig 1855
- Unterharzische Sagen. Aschersleben 1856
- Rheinlands schönste Sagen und Geschichten. 1886
- Harzsagen. Bad Harzburg 1957
