= Hornhausen stones =

7th-century Saxony-Anhalt carvings

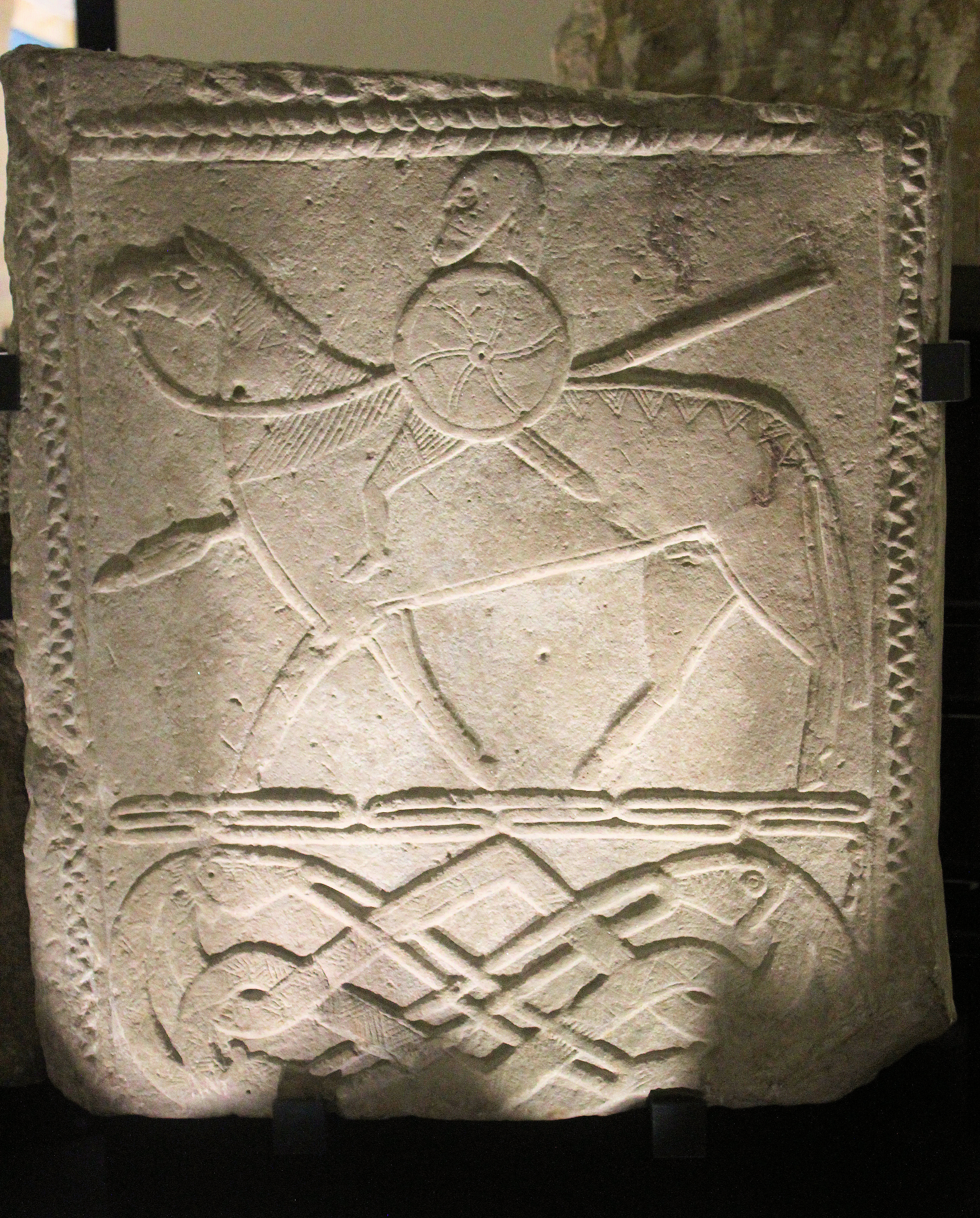
The rider stone (Stone 1). A Frankish horseman and his steed above a braided animal figure.

The Hornhausen stones are a set of fragmentary, 7th-century carved stones found in the village of Hornhausen (now part of Oschersleben) in Saxony-Anhalt, Germany. The carved stones feature interlaced animal figures, deer, riders and their steeds, and a Christian flag.

The most famous and best preserved of the stones is the Hornhausen rider stone (German: Reiterstein), which depicts a Frankish horseman on his steed with a braided serpent-like animal underfoot. The rider stone was uncovered during farmwork in 1874 and used to pave a cowshed until it was purchased, along with two other fragments, by the Halle State Museum of Prehistory in 1912. Later excavations where the rider stone was found revealed more fragments and a large early medieval graveyard.

Once thought to have formed a pagan grave monument, the stones are now believed to be fragments of a stone chancel screen used in a nearby Christian chapel. Stylistically related are the Morsleben stones, found in the church of nearby Morsleben. These stones are also believed to be fragments of a chancel screen, perhaps from the same workshop.

== Discovery and archaeological context ==
Hornhausen and Morsleben in Saxony-Anhalt.

The village of Hornhausen sits on a fertile plain in the north of the Harz foothills. It is an early medieval settlement located within historical Thuringia (a region of a different extent than its modern namesake state). Prior to the missionary activity of Boniface in Germany, Thuringia was one of the few regions of Germany with a strong Christian presence (though perhaps lacking an organised church). The Thuringian royal family was already Christian in the 6th century and by the 7th century, Frankish dukes may have been spreading Christianity further within the territory. If the Hornhausen stones are Christian, they represent the furthest geographical extent of Thuringian Christianity prior to Boniface.

Stone 1 (the rider stone) was unearthed in 1874 during ploughing. The rider stone was installed by the landlord, face down, in the floor of a cowshed. Similarly, at time of purchase, Stone 3 was being used by its owner as a household decoration. In 1912, Stones 1, 2 and 3 were obtained from residents of Hornhausen and placed in the collection of the Halle State Museum of Prehistory. This acquisition was directed by Hans Hahne.

Fortunately for archaeologists, at the time of purchase the residents still recalled the spot at which Stone 1 had been found. Excavations began on this plot in 1914. In the immediate vicinity, a double grave was unearthed. One skeleton, identified as male, was buried in a wooden coffin with an iron knife and buckle. The other skeleton (gender unidentified) was buried without any goods. The burial has been dated to the 7th century or 8th century. Further excavations carried out from 1921 to 1925 revealed as many as 63 burials in the area (including the graves of three horses). The identity of those buried has been described by Matthias Friedrich as "of ambiguous, possibly Christian origin". A chapel dedicated to St Mary is reported to have existed near the cemetery, but was abandoned sometime in the 15th or 16th century.

Two of the Hornhausen stones (4 and 6) were found buried in the double grave's filling, and Stone 5 was found about 50 cm northwest of the double grave. Three further stones, which archaeologist Kurt Böhner was not able to trace by the time of his 1977 article, were apparently uncovered but later lost. If they were carved, their appearance has not been recorded.

In 1934, three fragments of carved sandstone were found in Sankt-Petrus-Kirche at nearby Morsleben (a village about 20 km from Hornhausen). They were found being used as spolia in the walls of the church tower, which was dated to about 1000 CE. Prehistorian Paul Grimm publicised these stones' existence and linked them to the Hornhausen stones. Two fragments (Morsleben Stones 1 and 2) are currently on display in the church, while the third fragment has not been able to be traced (per Böhner's article) and its appearance is unrecorded.

== Description ==
=== Hornhausen stones ===
External image
- The five further extant stone fragments found at Hornhausen. Stones 2-6 are here identified by their conventional numbering.

The Hornhausen stones are carved from a soft, light grey sandstone found not far from Hornhausen, near Sollstedt. The largest fragment, Stone 1, is 78 cm by 66 cm by 15 cm. Böhner has estimated that originally each fragment was part of a stele measuring 105 cm by 75 cm.

Stone 1 was once divided into three registers, two of which survive clearly to this day. The central register is that of a rider on his steed. The lower register is that of a serpent-like animal. The zigzagging band which frame the figures suggests there was once a register above the rider. The poorly-preserved marks above the central register are probably feet turned to the right. Given the width of the framing, Böhner has inferred that there were originally ten feet, and therefore the upper register showed five figures turned to the right. The rider is depicted with a moustache, goatee, and long hair at the back of the head. To his left, he wields a shield decorated with a swirl and a longsword, to his right, a lance. His steed is trotting along, its head held in a loose rein. The horse is not depicted entirely naturalistically: it is much too big for its rider and unnatural lines are carved in the horse's head. The animal figures below, which Böhner identifies with a single snake curled over on itself, are more conservatively described by Friedrich as "interlaced Style II animals in a double S-shape".

Stone 2 is much worse preserved, but from the surviving fragment appears to have been substantially the same as Stone 1. What survives is the lower part of the horse, with the leg of the person astride it, and the upper part of an interlaced animal figure. The steed's body does appear to be longer and its trot bigger than that of Stone 1. The hoof placement is much more cleanly rendered than that in Stone 1.

Two fragmentary images survive on Stone 3. The lower image is of a doe (surviving in full with the exception of its hooves), a stag (only the head and antlers visible), and an animal (of which only the tip of the snout survives). Given the width of the plates, it seems likely that whatever animal it was on the right, it was not originally depicted in full. The upper image is an interlace design: a fluid loop crosses itself two times and symmetrically intertwines with two diamonds.

Stone 4 displays a parallelogram flag with a Greek cross on it and three pennons. This stone is notable as is the only one of the stones with an explicit symbol of Christianity. Böhner conjecturally identifies this flag as a Roman gonfanon.

Stone 5 depicts a deer's head and Stone 6 depicts the head of an unidentified animal. Both animal heads are carved in sharp relief; the eyes (circles with dot pupils) and mouths (straight lines) are rendered much more primitively than those in Stone 3. Stones 5 and 6 are usually grouped together on the assumption they came from the same carving.

=== Morsleben stones ===
The Morsleben stones are carved from a light yellow sandstone found near the village. The largest Morsleben stone is much bigger than the largest Hornhausen stone, with Morsleben Stone 1 measuring 117 cm by 69 cm by 18 cm. Böhner suspects this fragment is part of a symmetric double panel, measuring 120 cm by 120 cm. Similarly, Böhner has estimated that Morsleben Stone 2 (which measures 74.5 cm by 53.5 cm) belonged to a stone panel measuring 120 cm by 60 cm.

Stone 1 is divided into two registers. The lower shows a four-legged, broad-chested animal, probably a lamb. A horizontal line through the lamb was thought to be part of a rider's lance by Paul Grimm. But given the Christian context, it is more likely to represent a cross staff which the lamb is carrying. An object in front of the lamb's head is indistinct. In the lower left corner is a five-pointed star. The upper register shows a braided animal figure akin to that of Hornhausen Stones 1 and 2. The jaw of this animal figure is intertwined with its body.

Stone 2 depicts a cross with an X intersecting it. The upper part of the cross and the X are much truncated. Originally, the cross probably continued as far up as it does down. Both the X and cross are decorated with periodic triangles jutting out, which Böhner reads as suggestive of the branches of the tree of life.

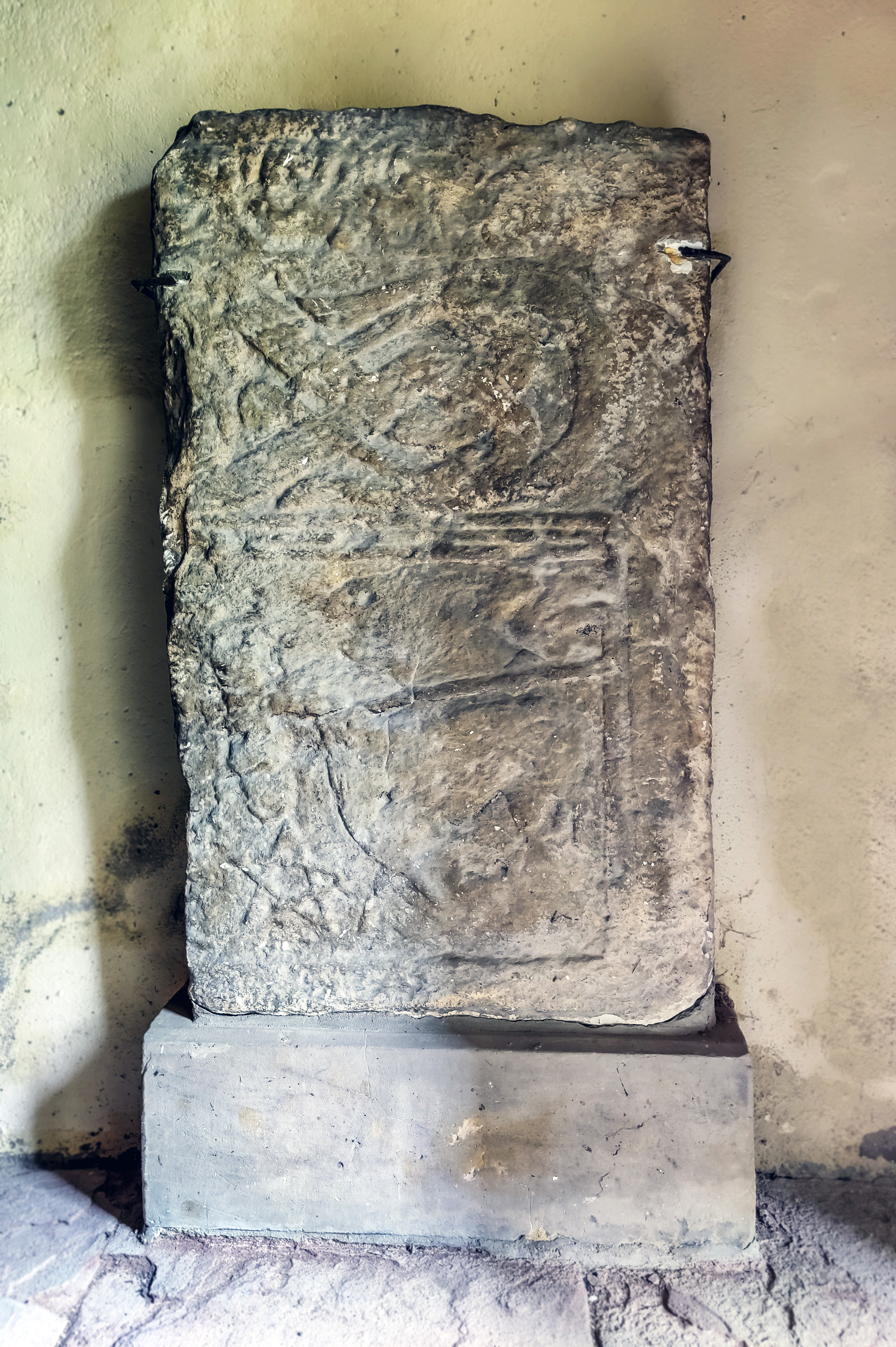
Morsleben Stone 1. Below, a lamb carries the cross. Above is a braided animal figure akin to that of the rider stone.

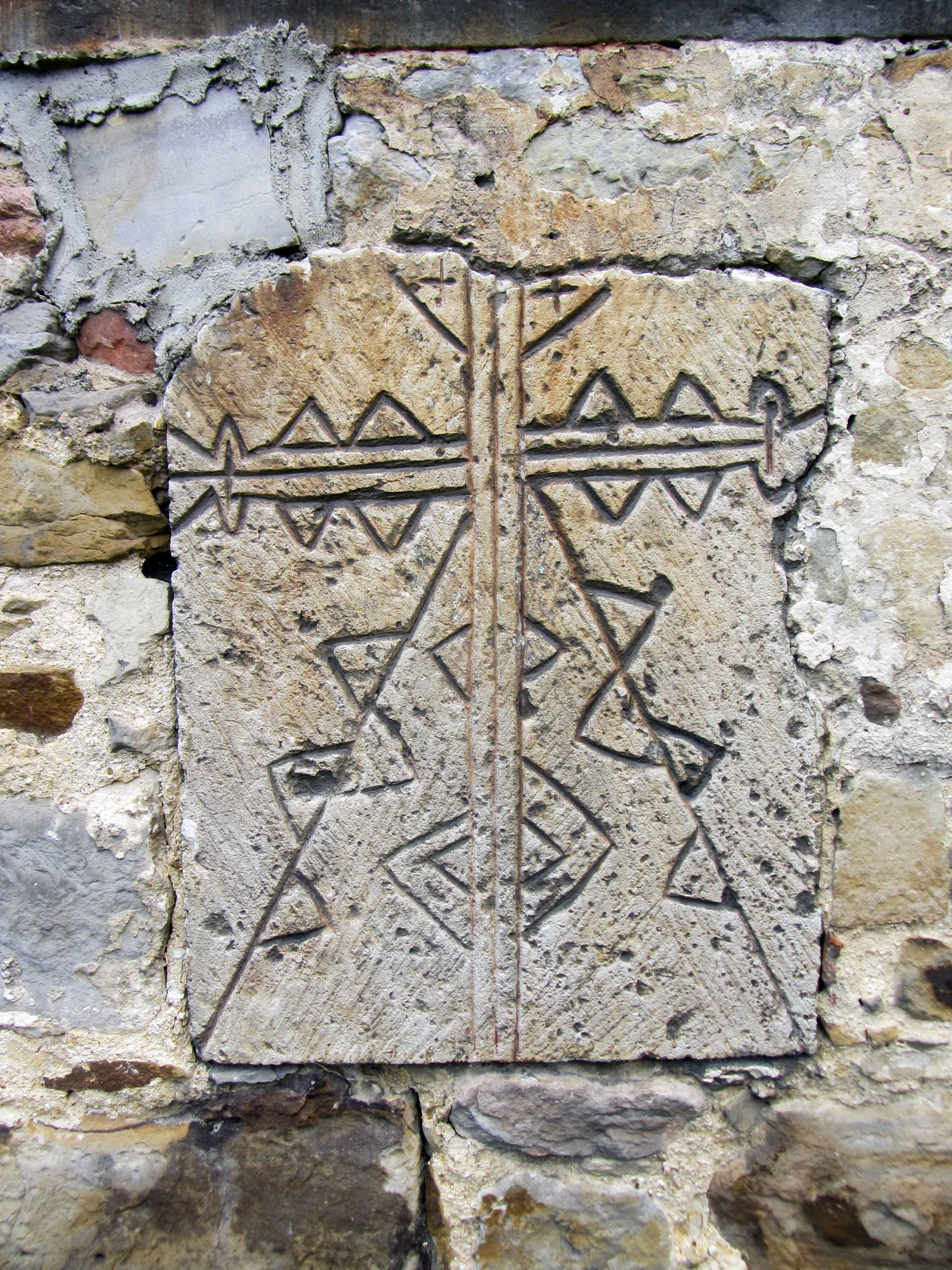
Morsleben Stone 2. A stylised cross intersecting an X. Triangular decorations are suggestive of the tree of life.

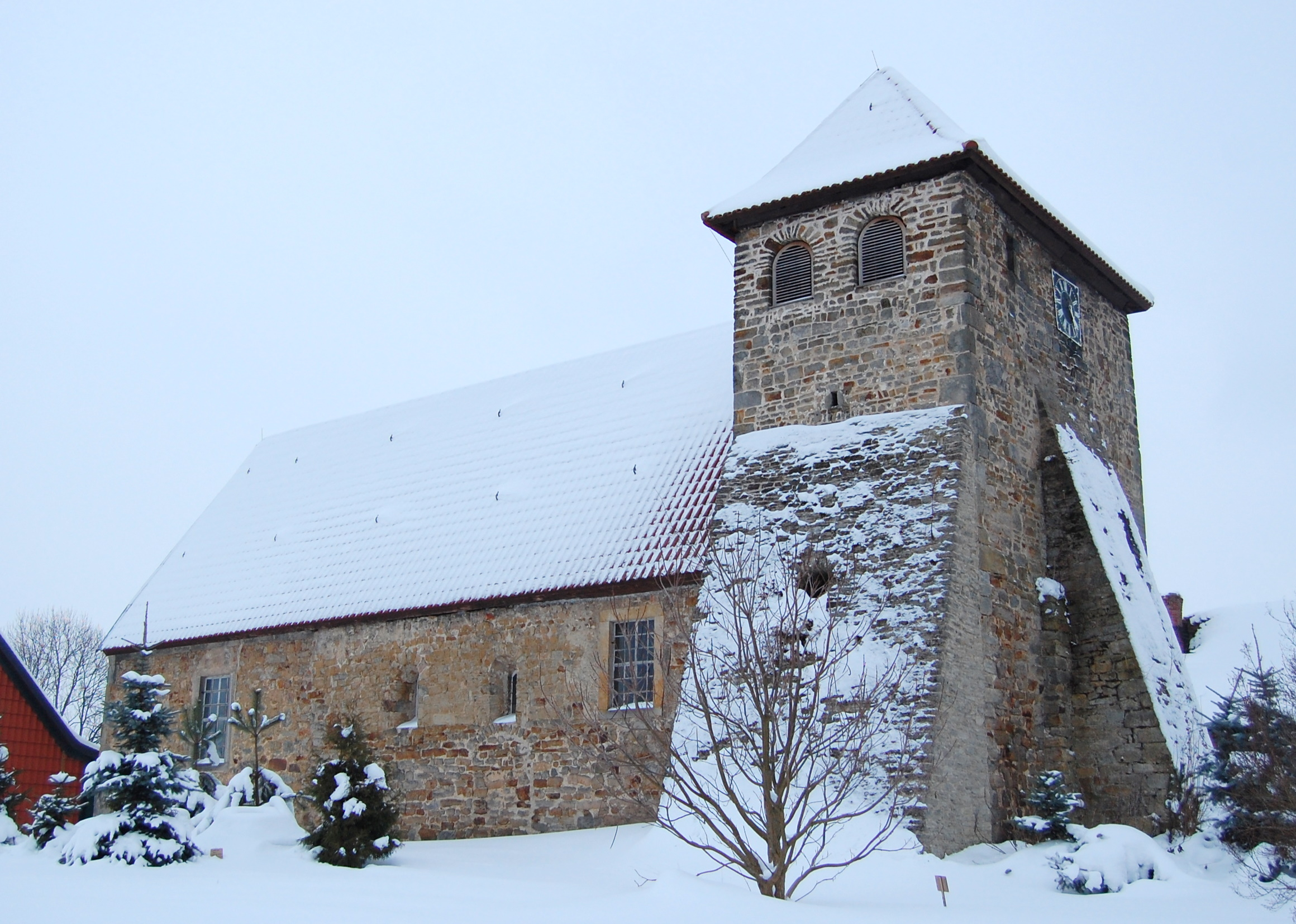
Sankt-Petrus-Kirche, where the Morsleben stones were found.

== Interpretation ==
The horse and serpent underfoot in Stones 1 and 2 are carved in Germanic Animal Style II (as defined by Bernhard Salin in his classification of early Germanic animal ornament). On the basis of this style, the stones have been dated to the second quarter of the 7th century (though other dates have been given). Much attention has been directed to the style of this rider and the animal below, which is supposed to "depict Christian motifs but in ‘pagan’ style." Böhner identified distinct features of Germanic horse-riding in the carving, and thought that the lines on the horse's head suggested Germanic depictions of snakes. The carvings' author has been suggested to be Anglo-Saxon or Scandinavian based on these motifs. Karen Høilund Nielsen has gone as far to say that there "may be a much more Scandinavian world-view embodied in the designs of these two plates than accepted by Böhner, who saw the images as Christian with a Scandinavian touch." However, Romina Schiavone has studied the motifs and style and found them to be more broadly "Frankish-Mediterranean", with no elements which do not find their parallel in contemporaneous Christian art. Matthias Friedrich has been sharply critical of the supposed opposition between pagan and Christian styles.

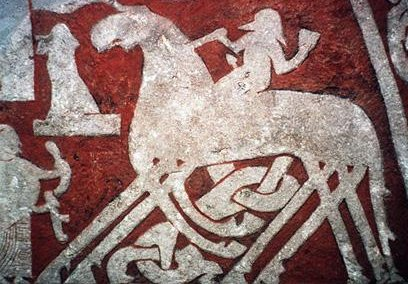
A rider on Odin's eight-legged steed Sleipnir as depicted on the Tjängvide image stone in Gotland. The rider stone was first assumed to show a warrior riding Sleipnir into Valhalla.

Before Böhner's 1977 article, much literature on the Hornhausen stones assumed that the stones were carved for the purpose of a funerary monument, given how closely the find spot was to the double burial. Under the influence of the Gotland picture stones, Hahne (the first to publish of the stones) interpreted the rider as the deceased, riding into Valhalla on Odin's horse Sleipnir. Later interpreters were more cautious in their conjecture, but all identified the stone within a (frequently pagan) funerary context. Some identified the horseman with Odin himself or a warrior of Odin. Hahne disregarded the cross on Stone 4 as a mere geometric figure, which did not intend a Christian interpretation.

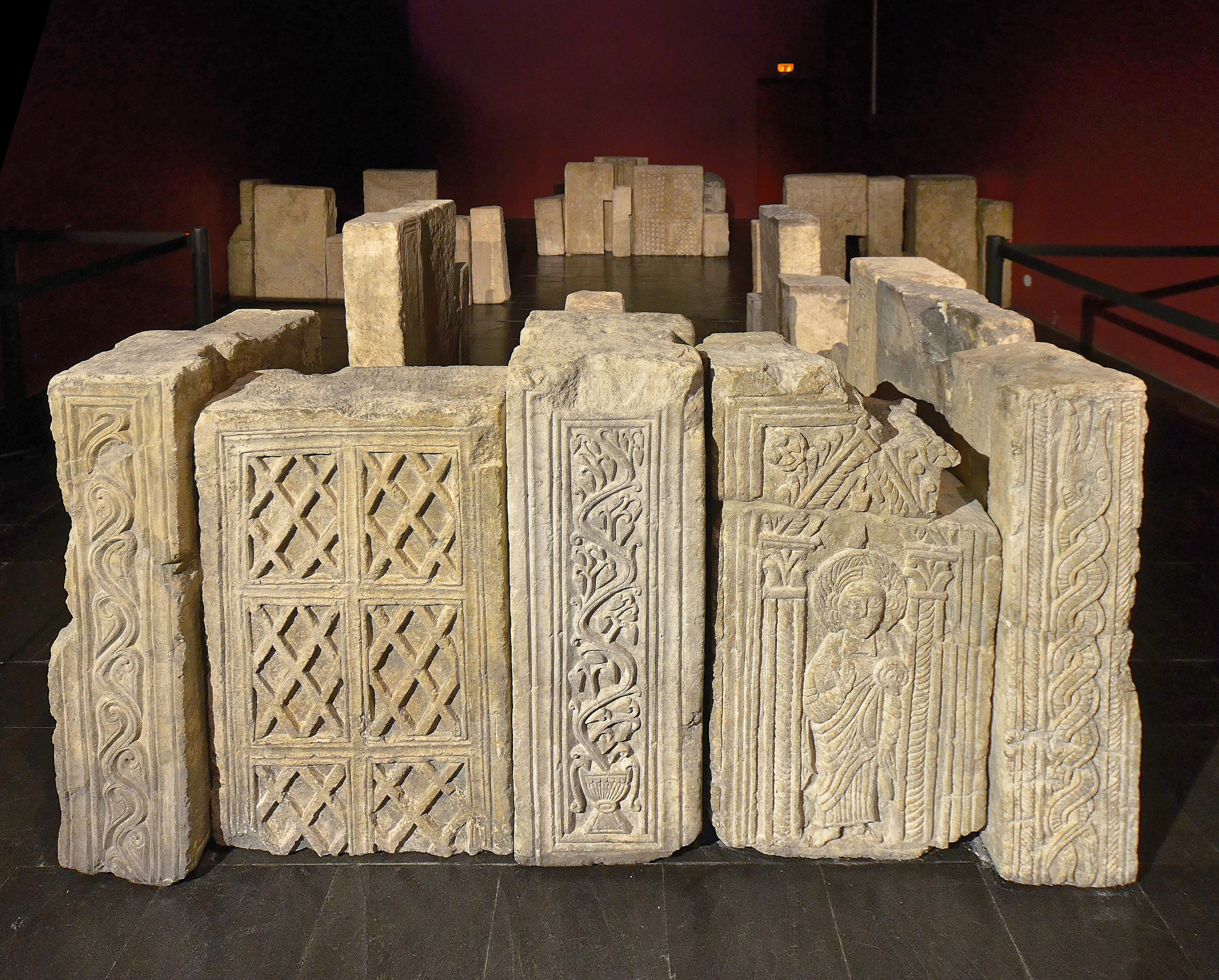
Kurt Böhner drew comparison between the decorative elements of the Hornhausen stones and those found on the stone chancel screen of the 7th-century Basilica of Saint-Pierre-aux-Nonnains in Metz.

Given their originally large dimensions, Böhner felt that the interpretation of the stones as grave monuments was unsustainable. The only medieval function that fit carved, relief panels of this dimension were chancel screens in a church setting. Other stone chancel screens from this period are known. For example, in the 7th-century Basilica of Saint-Pierre-aux-Nonnains in Metz, where the stone chancel screen exhibits similar zig-zag borders and braided decorative elements. He postulated that the Hornhausen stones were originally part of the chancel screen of the abandoned St Mary chapel, but were later removed to the graveyard. He postulated that Morsleben stones belonged to the chancel of the church they were found in. The Morsleben stones are important as they show that such stone chancel screens were not an isolated phenomenon in the region. Given the similarity in design, the two screens perhaps even came from the same creator or studio.

According Böhner's reconstruction, the chancel formed from the Hornhausen stones had four stele with riders on them and two with stags and does, arranged symmetrically. He identifies the riders with Frankish Reiterheiligen (literally, rider-saints) and the five figures above the rider with five saints in prayer. The snake underfoot is a common Christian motif for evil being triumphed over. He supposes that the flag in Stone 4 was held by another rider in place of a lance.

This view has been widely accepted within the scholarship, though Schiavone has revised Böhner's reconstruction slightly. Høilund Nielsen also revises Böhner's conclusions: on the grounds of her interpretation of the carvings within Scandinavian culture, she argues that the feet are more likely to have belonged to a group of warriors. Such a warrior-motif is a recurrent one in 7th-century Scandinavian art.

== Legacy ==
The rider stone is an iconic German archaeological find and a universal symbol of the Early Middle Ages within Germany. While the original remains at the Halle State Museum, there are copies in Börde Museum Ummendorf and in the tower of St. Stephani Church, Hornhausen.

The rider stone was the model for the coat of arms of Adenstedt, a municipal subdivision of Ilsede, adopted in 1954 on the presumption that it depicts Odin. In 1970, East Germany issued a stamp with the rider stone on it. In 2007, a design based on the rider stone was chosen for the coat of arms of the newly created Börde district.

=== Gallery ===
The coat of arms of Börde.

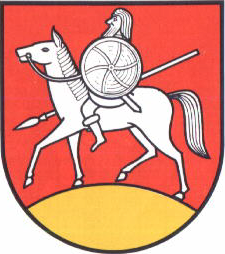
The coat of arms of Adenstedt.

== See also ==
- Moselkern stele
- Niederdollendorf stone
