= Basalt cross =

Type of Christian stone cross found in Germany

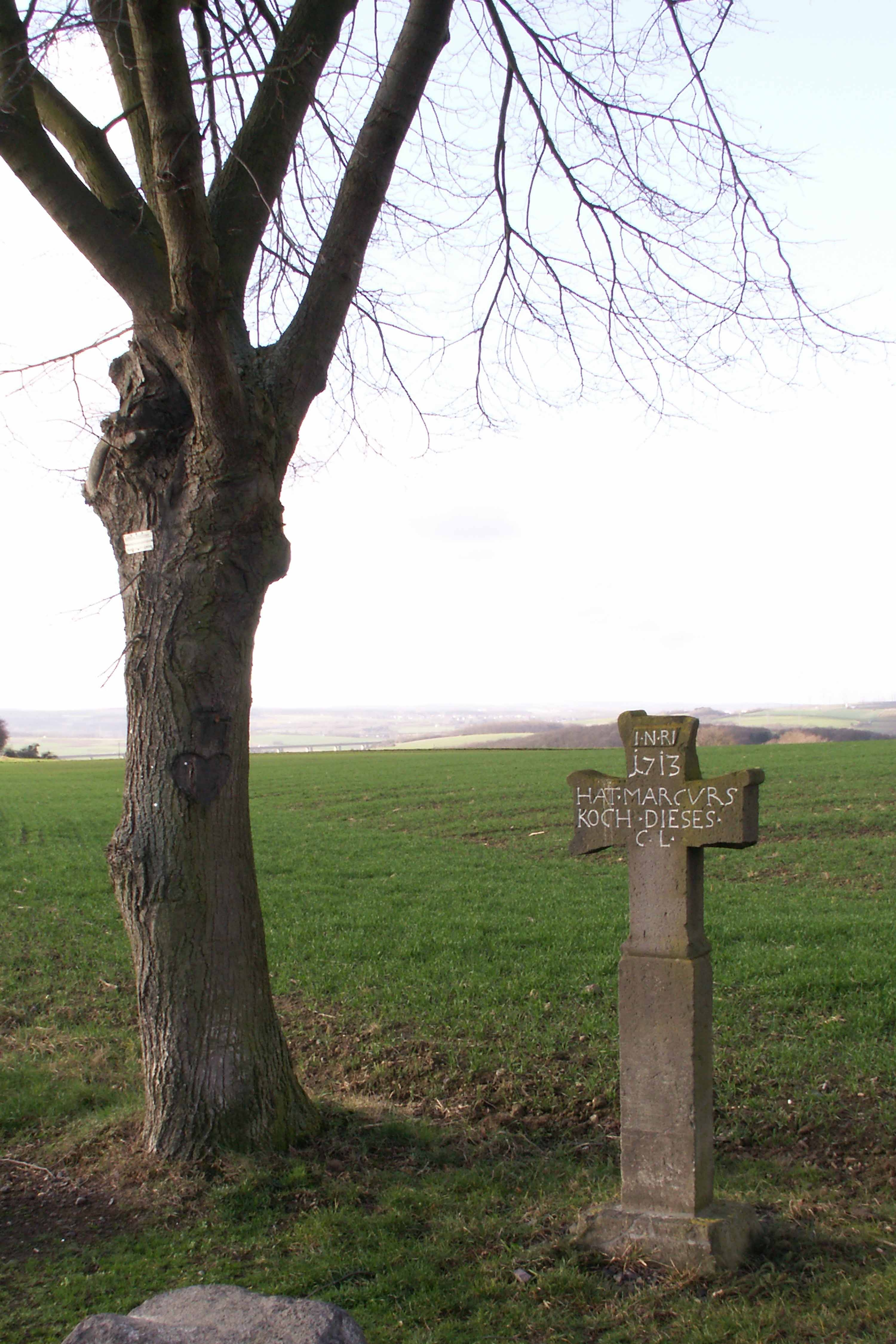
A typical basalt cross

The basalt cross (German: Basaltkreuz) is a particular type of stone cross found in the Eifel mountains of Germany, bearing witness to the piety of the local population in times past. These crosses indicate their beliefs as well as the wealth and standing of the people who erected them. Details such as accidents, occupations and prayer requests have survived, thanks to the extremely weather-resistant material of which the crosses are made. Their geographic distribution is centred on the basalt quarries of Mayen and Mendig, and covers an area with a radius of approximately 30 kilometres between the Rhine, Ahr and Moselle rivers. The exact number of monuments is not known. Local historian, Kurt Müller-Veltin, estimates that there are about 4,500 wayside crosses and about 6,000 grave crosses. The conservation of these monuments is undertaken by the Rhenisch Society for Monument Conservation (Rheinische Verein für Denkmalpflege).

== Early examples ==
Wayside monuments known as Schöpflöffel ("ladle") due to their shape, appeared up to the 16th century. The Nischenstock ("niche post") was derived from it but a cross was added above the niche.

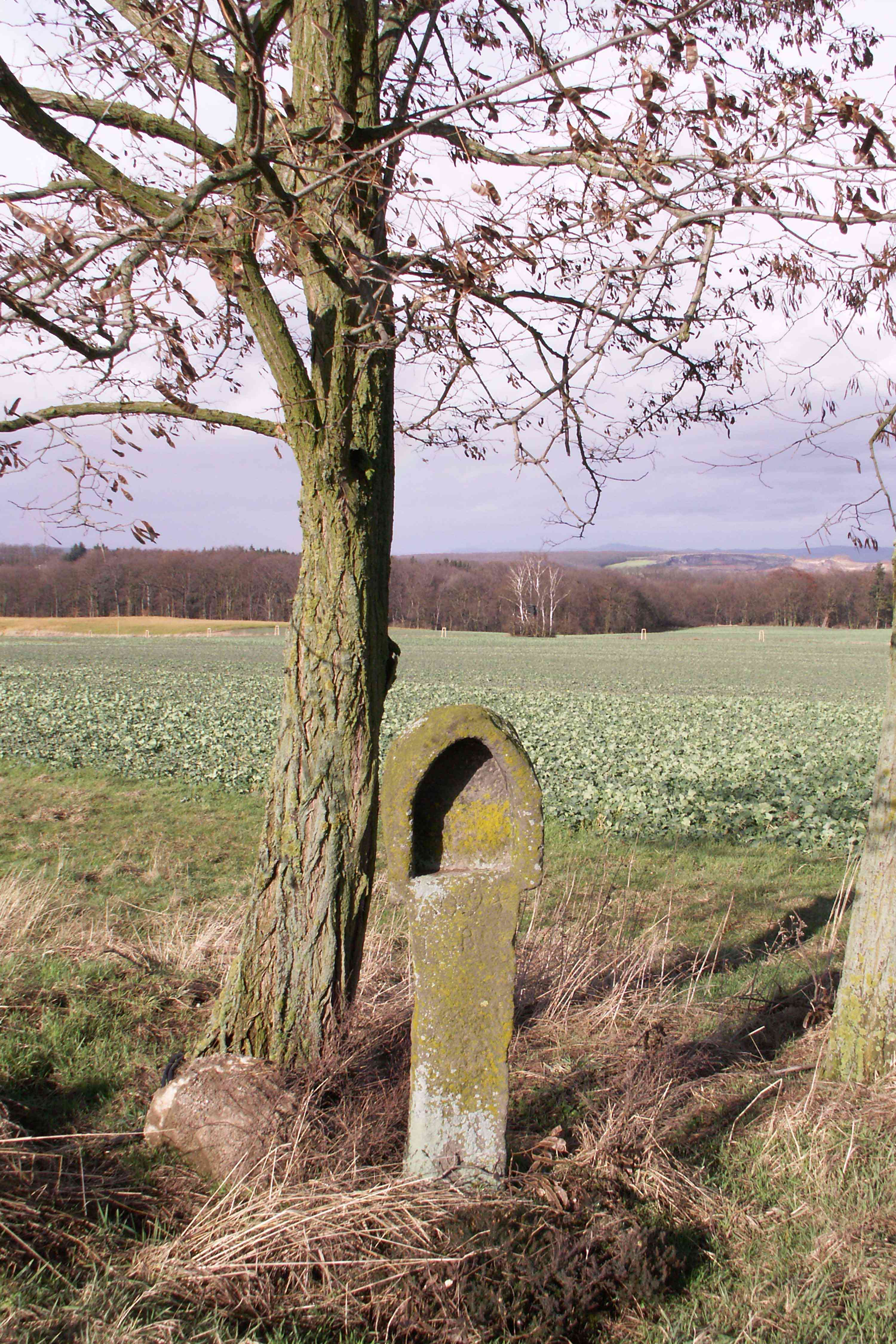
Undated Schöpflöffel wayside monument

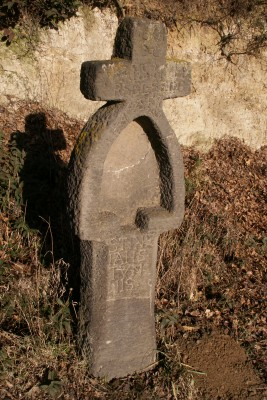
1601 Nischenstock with cross

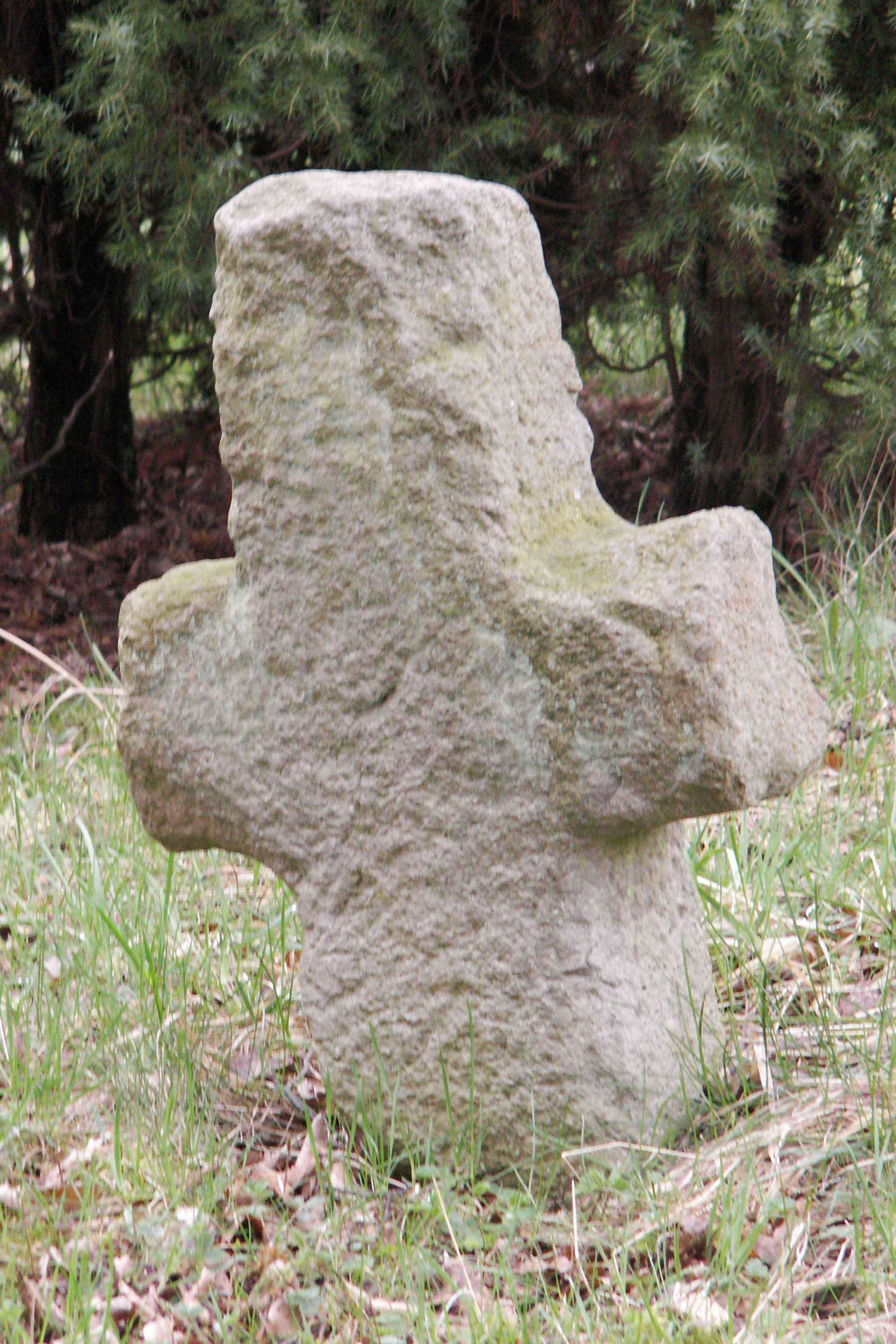
Undated basalt cross

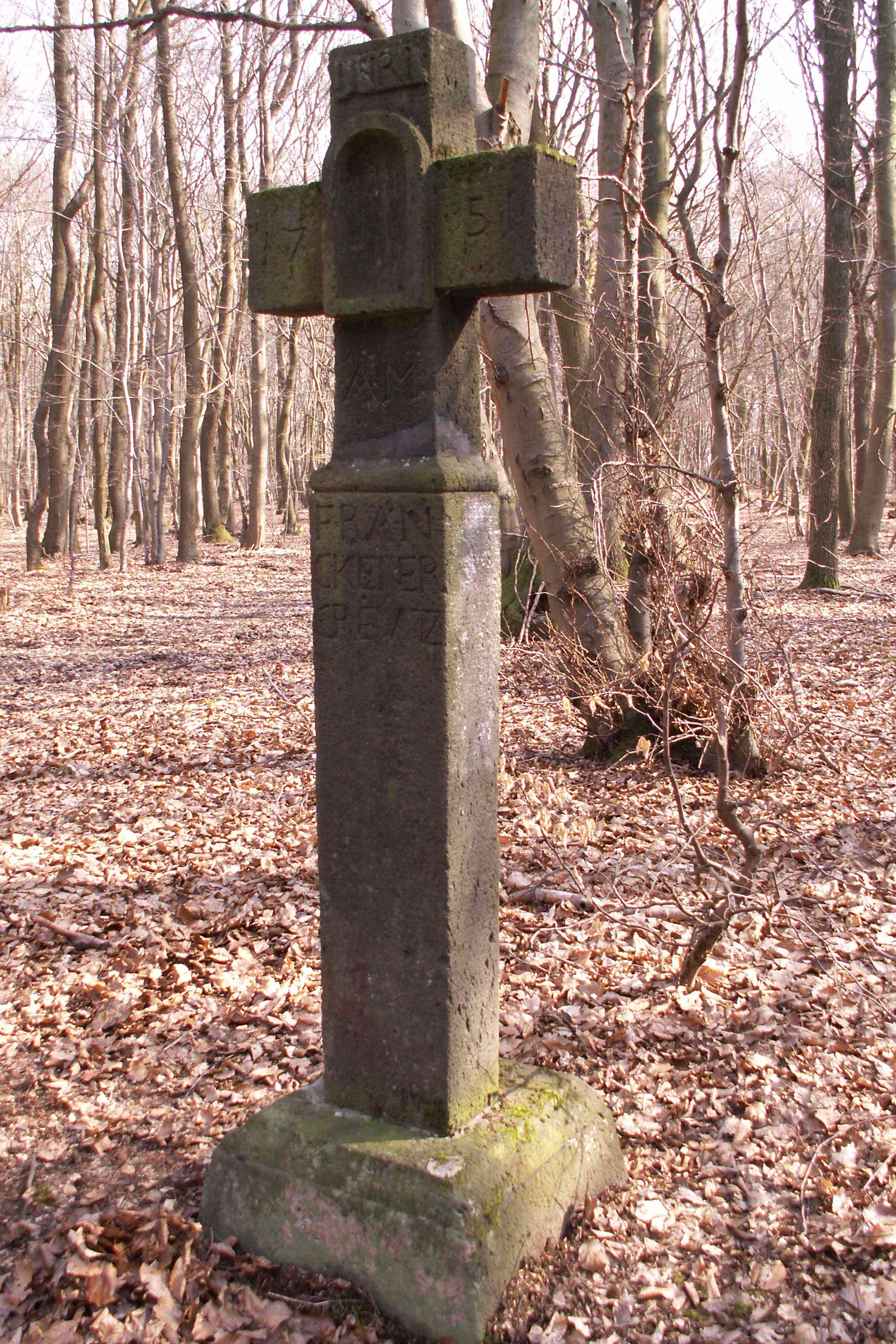
A.D. 1751

== Dating ==
The earliest monuments date to 1461; their benefactor was Clais Beligen.

== Blessing stones ==
Some crosses were erected as "blessing stones" and had niches carved in them to hold the Blessed Sacrament (the host) during services as part of outdoor processions.

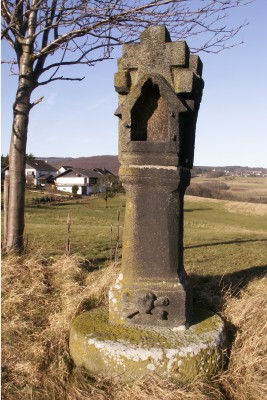
16__

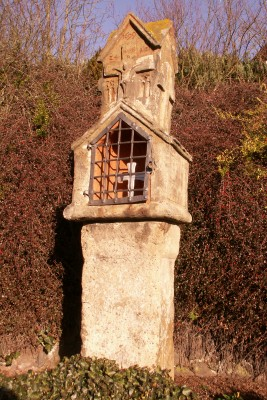
1699

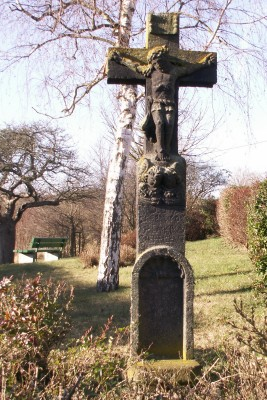
1881

== Grave crosses ==
Particularly impressive grave crosses from the 18th century have survived in Mayschoß and in Dümpelfeld. On one side is the image of Christ with various symbols; on the other there is an inscription with details of the deceased.

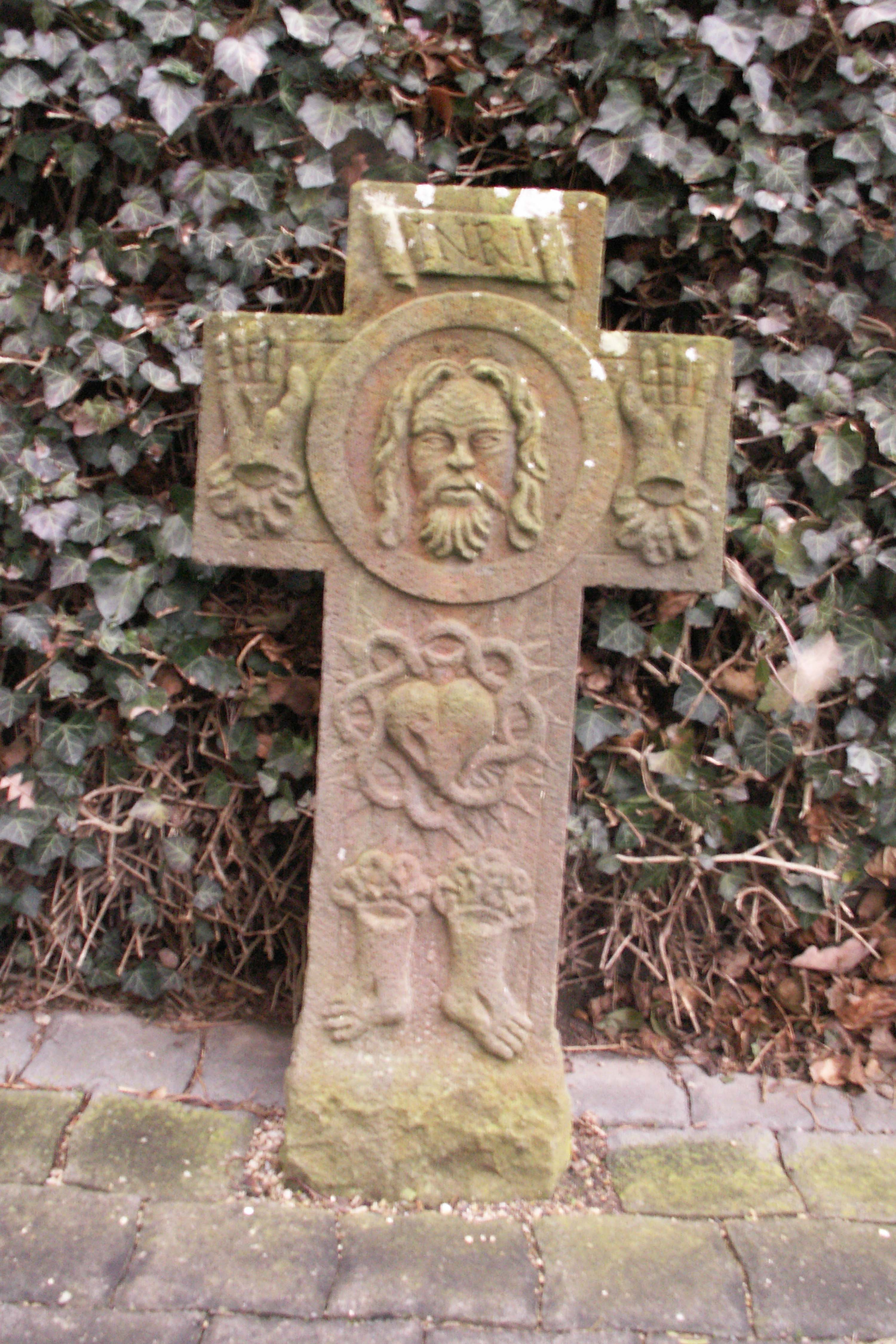
Cross depicting the man of sorrows

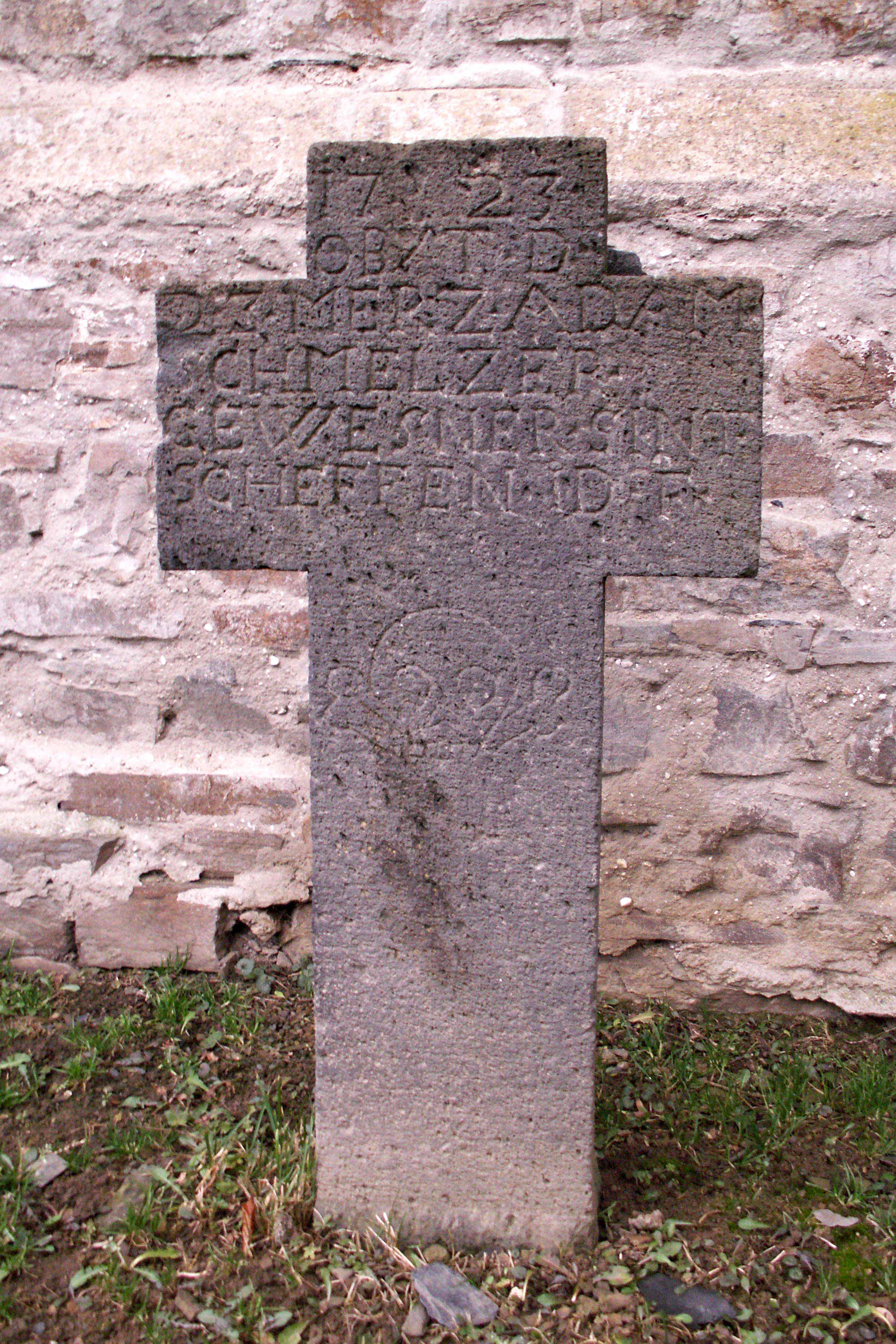
Inscription side of a basalt grave cross

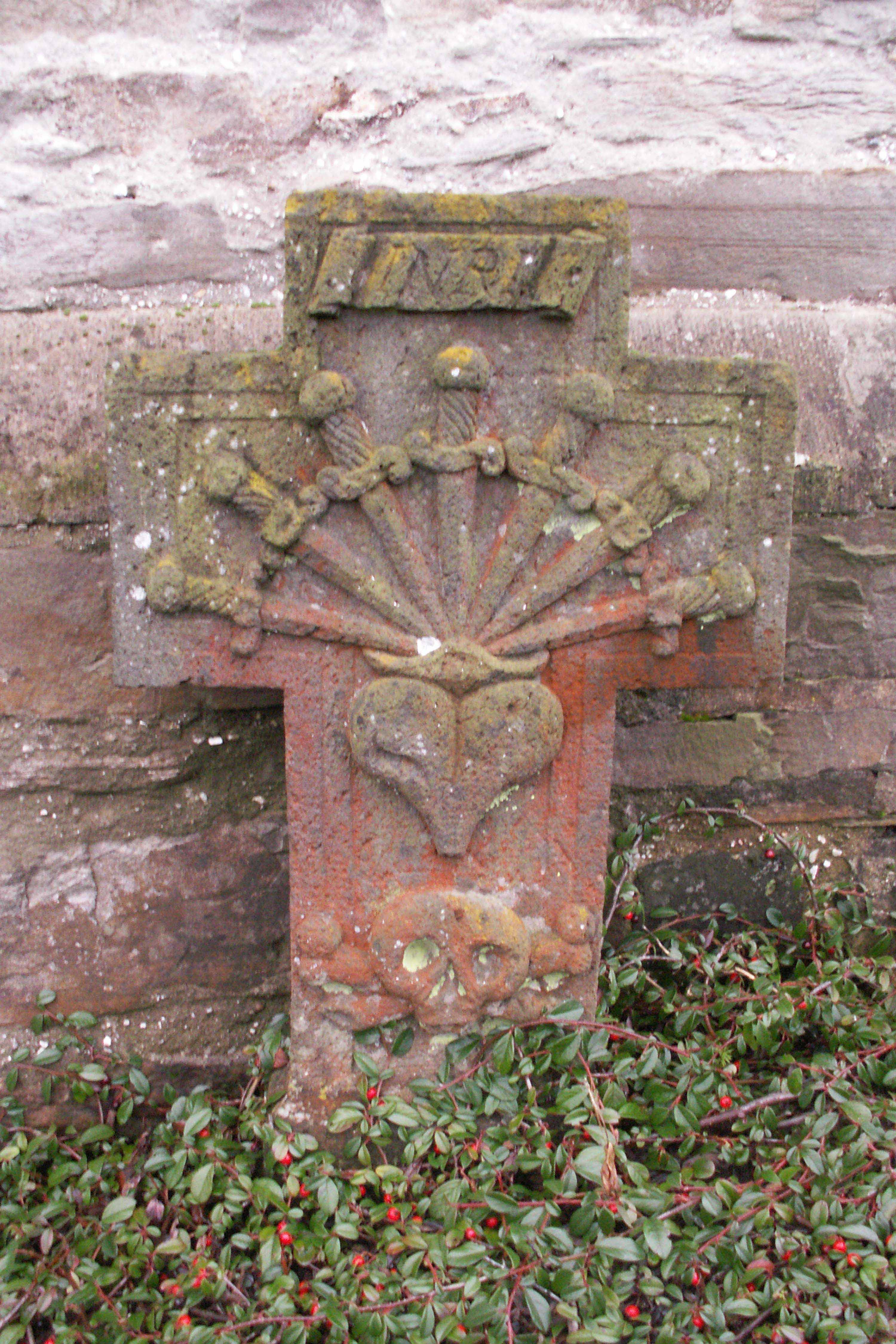
Cross with Seven Swords image

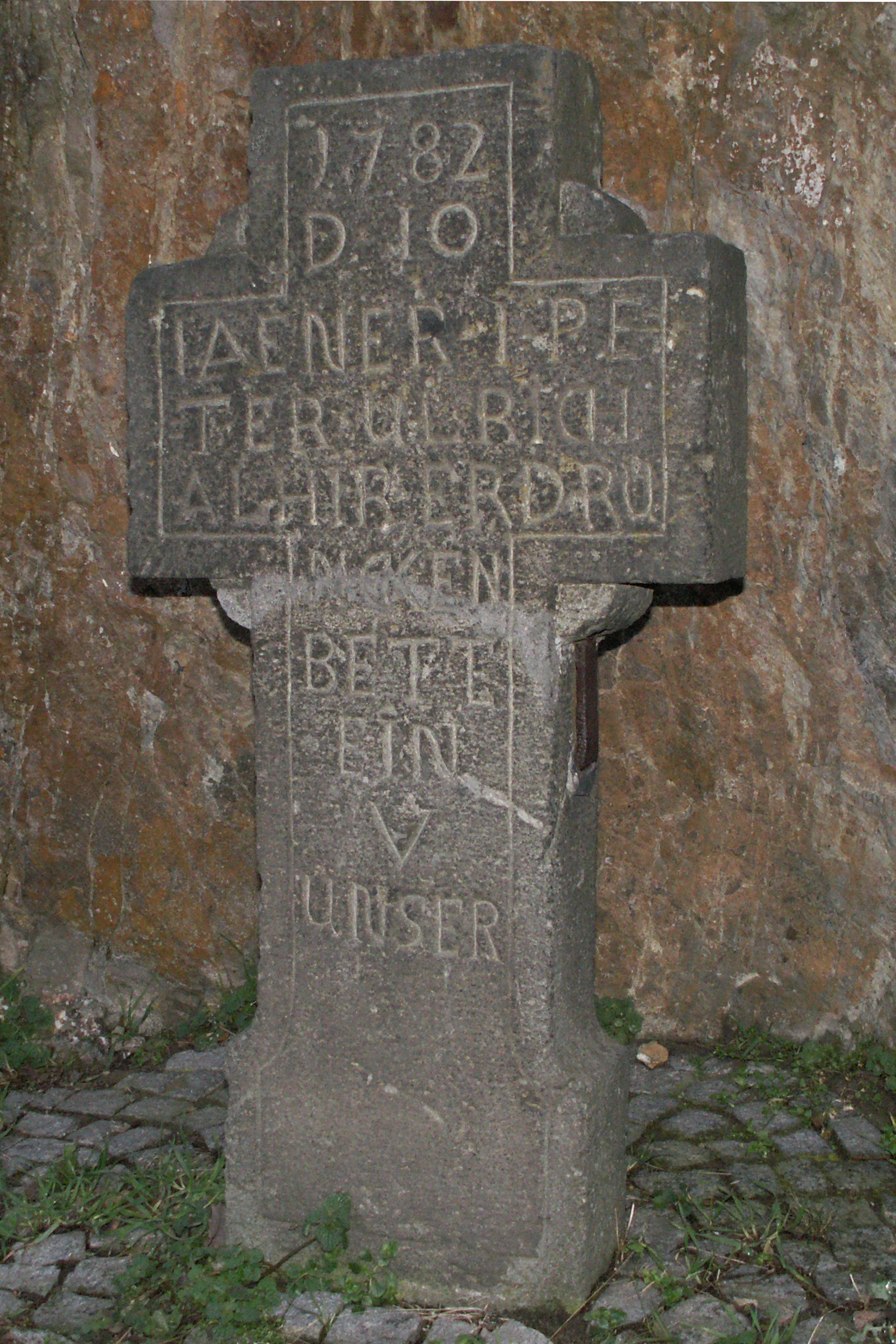
Cross of drowned person

== Protection, defence and atonement ==
In the Early and High Middle Ages crosses were understood to provide protection from lightning, hail and other natural catastrophes. Atonement crosses were also erected in some places to provide satisfaction following murders and other serious crimes. Even unusual accidents were often a reason to put up a cross.

== Inscriptions and house marks ==
The inscriptions are usually in German with dialectical influences. Years were given in Roman numerals to begin with, but later Arabic numerals were used. A commonly used abbreviation was D.S.G.G. which meant Der Seele Gott Gnade ("God have mercy on the soul"). The photograph shows an example of maximum economy in inscription writing e.g. MARIA

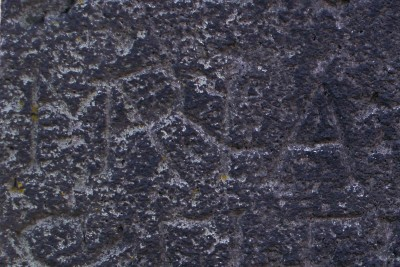
MAR_I_A

House marks are signs and ownership symbols of the clans or noble families. These marks may be used to work out when the deceased or donor lived.

== Workshops ==
Originally the crosses were not produced in special workshops, but were by products of other stonemason businesses. Around 1630 specialist cross workshops emerged and crosses can usually be classified from the inscription style of the stonemason.

== Material ==
Strictly speaking, the lava rock that was used from the quarries between Mayen and Mendig was not basalt, but a so-called tephrite lava. This scientific distinction did not make its way into every speech, however, as formerly all black, volcanic rock was described here as "basalt". The rock is relatively easy to work thanks to its coarse pores, but so weather-resistant that it survives for centuries without being significantly affected.

== See also ==
- Moselkern stele, an early Christian cross at the mouth of the Mosel, also made of Basalt.

== Literature ==
- Karl-Friedrich Amendt: Rheinische Wegkreuze (Bildstöcke). Geheimnisvolle Zeugen mittelalterlichen Denkens. Edition Lempertz, Königswinter 2010, ISBN 978-3-941557-52-9.
- Kurt Müller-Veltin: Mittelrheinische Steinkreuze aus Basaltlava. 2. überarbeitete und erweiterte Auflage. Rheinischer Verein für Denkmalpflege und Landschaftsschutz, Köln 2001, ISBN 3-88094-570-5.
- Elke Lehmann-Brauns: Himmel, Hölle, Pest und Wölfe. Basaltlava-Kreuze der Eifel. 3. Auflage. Bachem, Köln 1996, ISBN 3-7616-1193-5.
- Manfred Mehlhop: Alte Steinkreuze im Gebiet der Verbandsgemeinde Brohltal. Mit einer Einführung von Kurt Müller-Veltin. Verbandsgemeinde, Brohltal 1993.
