= Niederdollendorf stone =

7th century CE Frankish stele

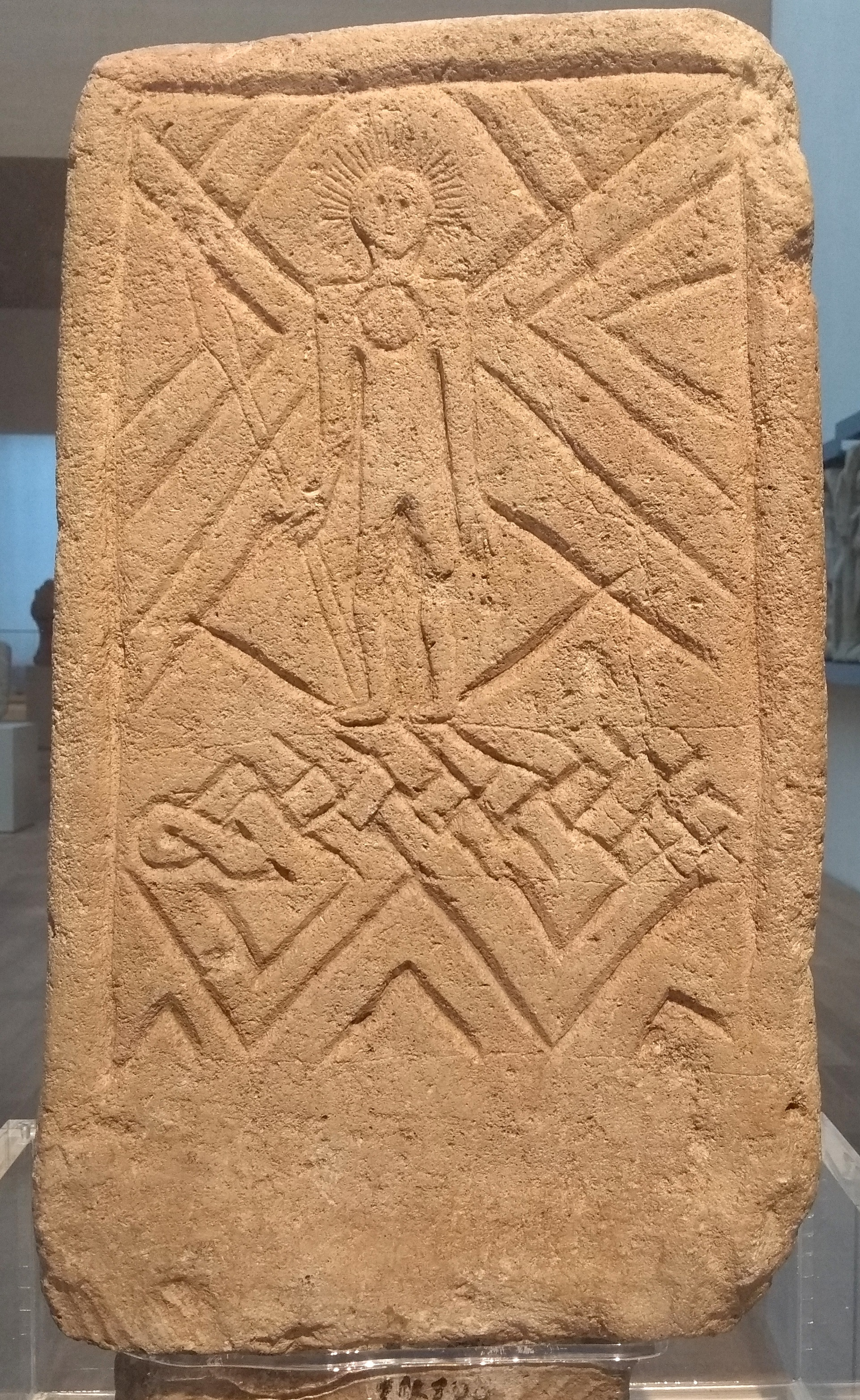
The side of the Niederdollendorf stone conjectured to depict Christ

The Niederdollendorf stone or gravestone is a carved Frankish stele from the late 7th century AD, named for the town Niederdollendorf (now part of Königswinter) where it was found in 1901 in a Frankish graveyard. The stone is notable both as an exemplary work of Frankish sculpture and as a possible early example of Germanic Christian material culture.

== Discovery and location ==
A Frankish graveyard was discovered about 400 m (1,300 ft) north of the boundary of Niederdollendorf in 1901 during construction work. No proper excavation took place other than the sporadic uncovering during this work and therefore the inventories of many of the graves have been lost. The graveyard (in use between the latter half of the 6th century and the 8th century) consisted of burials with oriented slabs and, in some cases, with grave goods buried within. The specific grave the Niederdollendorf stone belonged to had no grave goods and was dated to among the later of the graveyard's burials.

The stone is currently on display at Rheinisches Landesmuseum Bonn.

== Appearance and interpretation ==
The stone measures 42.5 cm by 22–25 cm by 16–19 cm (17" by 8–9" by 6–7") and was carved from Lorraine limestone. It was made in the 7th century and reused later (around the 8th century) as a gravestone. The original purpose is unknown, so the common reference to it as a "gravestone" is slightly misleading.

On one broad side, a spear-wielding man is shown standing on an interlace pattern. Rays extend from his head and he has a circle on his torso. Incised lines extend out from the chest and feet. German archeologist Kurt Böhner was the first to conjecture that this image is a depiction of Jesus, an interpretation that has since been widely adopted. Such conjecture reads the interlace under-foot as a serpent, representing evil trampled on by Christ. The rays, resembling hair, are read as a halo. No consensus has been found for an interpretation of the circle, which has been read as a Christian bulla, a torc, a kind of necklace, or perhaps some feature from a Roman torso plate. Böhner read the incised lines as a stylised aureole, an interpretation which has not been sustained by later scholarship. The spear is usually read as representative of a Germanic syncretisation of Christ, reconceptualising the triumphant Christ within a Germanic warrior culture.

Another scholar, Lynda Coon, describes the side depicting Christ as apocalyptic, as He stands between two mountains, one of the living, and one of the dead. The bellicose Christ wields a spear during the Last Judgement standing on a serpent. Christ is "bursting open the earth surrounding the graves of the righteous, such as the one inhabited by the upper-class soldier depicted on the other side." Furthermore, Lynda Coon theorises that the image of Christ is influenced by Sol Invictus, as his head emits rays of a solar nimbus, and his militaristic nature portrayed is similar to that of Sol Invictus' cult. A sun disk adorns his chest, further showing the similarity.

One critic of such interpretations is Michael Friedrich, who complains of the absence of "any distinct symbol or signifier that might enable us to clearly identify Christ or even presume a Christian frame of reference." Neither the interlace nor the rays around the figure's head are unambiguously a serpent or a halo. If the interlace is interpreted in this way, though the triumphant Christ is often depicted in Christian iconography as atop a serpent, the motif is common to Germanic sources as well. Friedrich instead reads the figure as a (perhaps deliberately) religiously ambiguous appropriation of Roman imperial symbols of power. Another critic J. M. Wallace-Hadrill, who favours an identification of the figure with Odin, said of the stone that if it is Christian, it is "a parody of Christianity by and for men still essentially pagan". German prehistorian Herbert Kühn also identified the figure with Odin, an interpretation which was in vogue in Germany during the Nazi era.

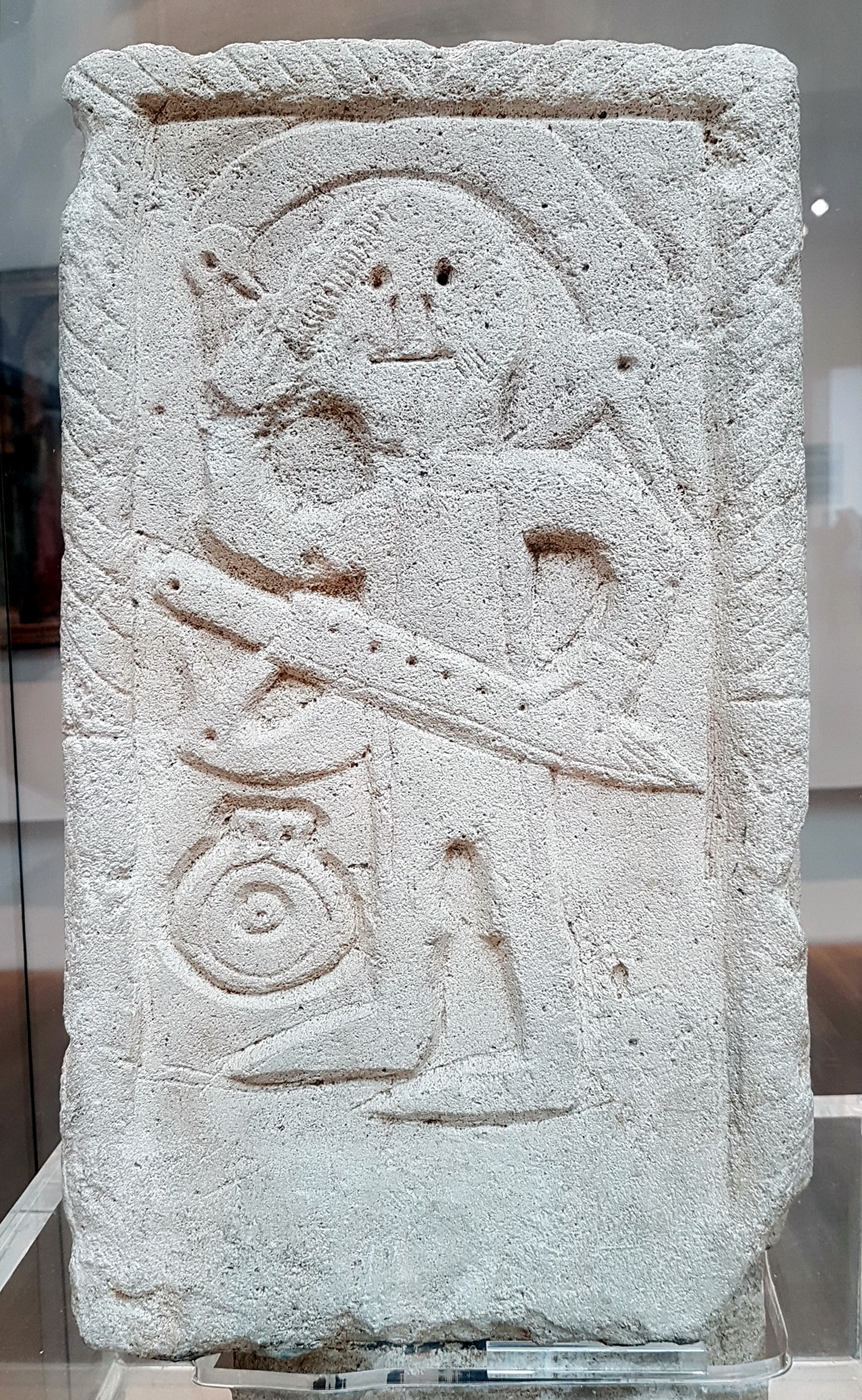
The side of the stone conjectured to depict a dead Frankish warrior.

The other broad side has been described as "one of the best-known examples of Frankish sculpture". It depicts a man with a sword or scramasax and what is perhaps a comb. A circular object near his legs is perhaps a canteen. Three serpent heads menace him from both sides. The comb and the serpents, respectively common pagan grave goods and grave symbols, are the main reasons that this side has so often been thought to show a pagan (or only semi-Christianised) Frankish warrior in his grave. Böhner saw the figure in this light, further contextualising the comb within the pagan Frankish association of hair with power. However, in more recent scholarship, Sebastian Ristow has contested this interpretation on the grounds that associations like these were by no means exclusively pagan, and would have been carried into later Christian cultures.

The narrow sides and top are decorated with a serpent and various geometric figures.

== Gallery ==
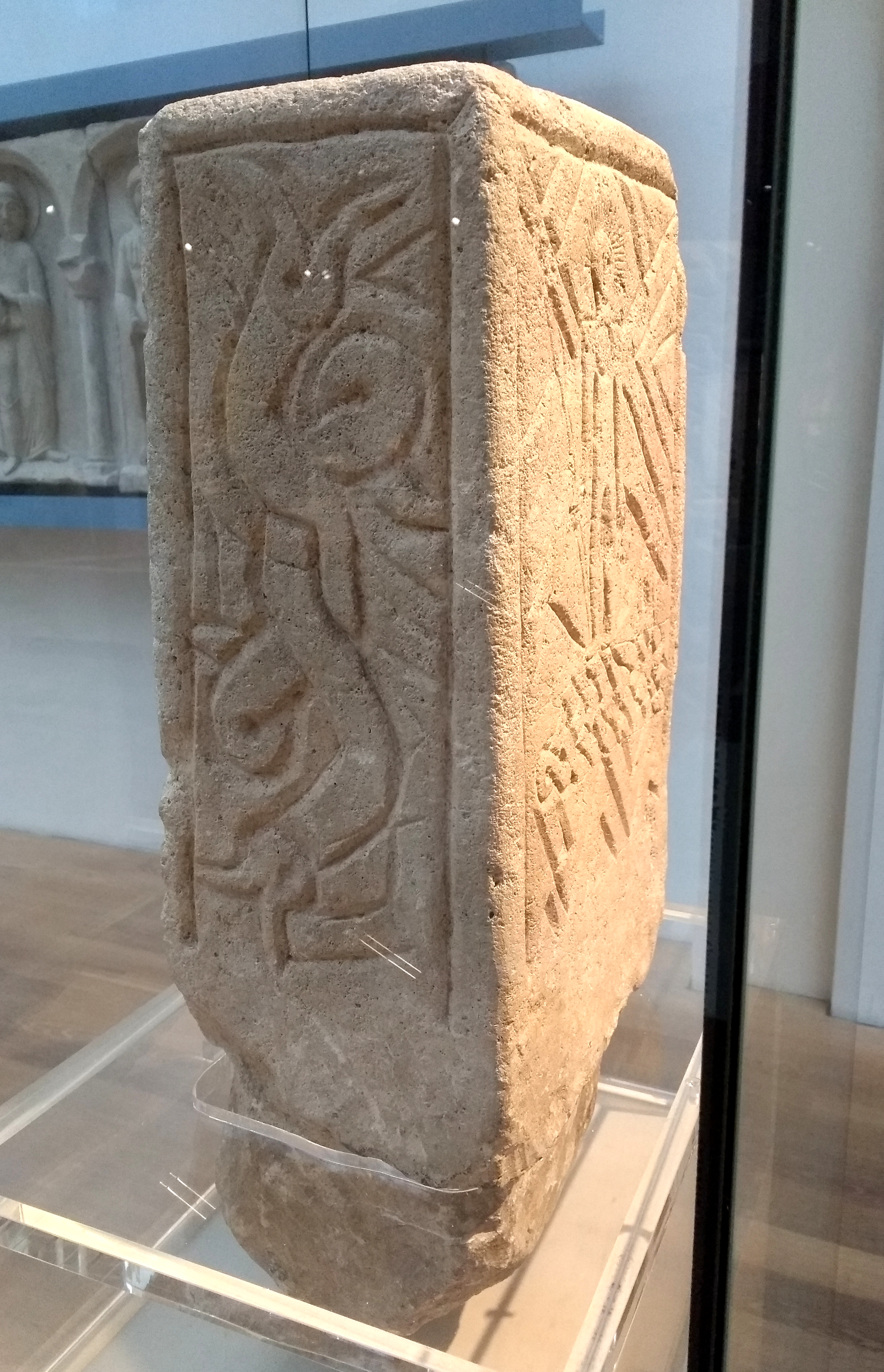
A narrow side of the stone, depicting a serpent.

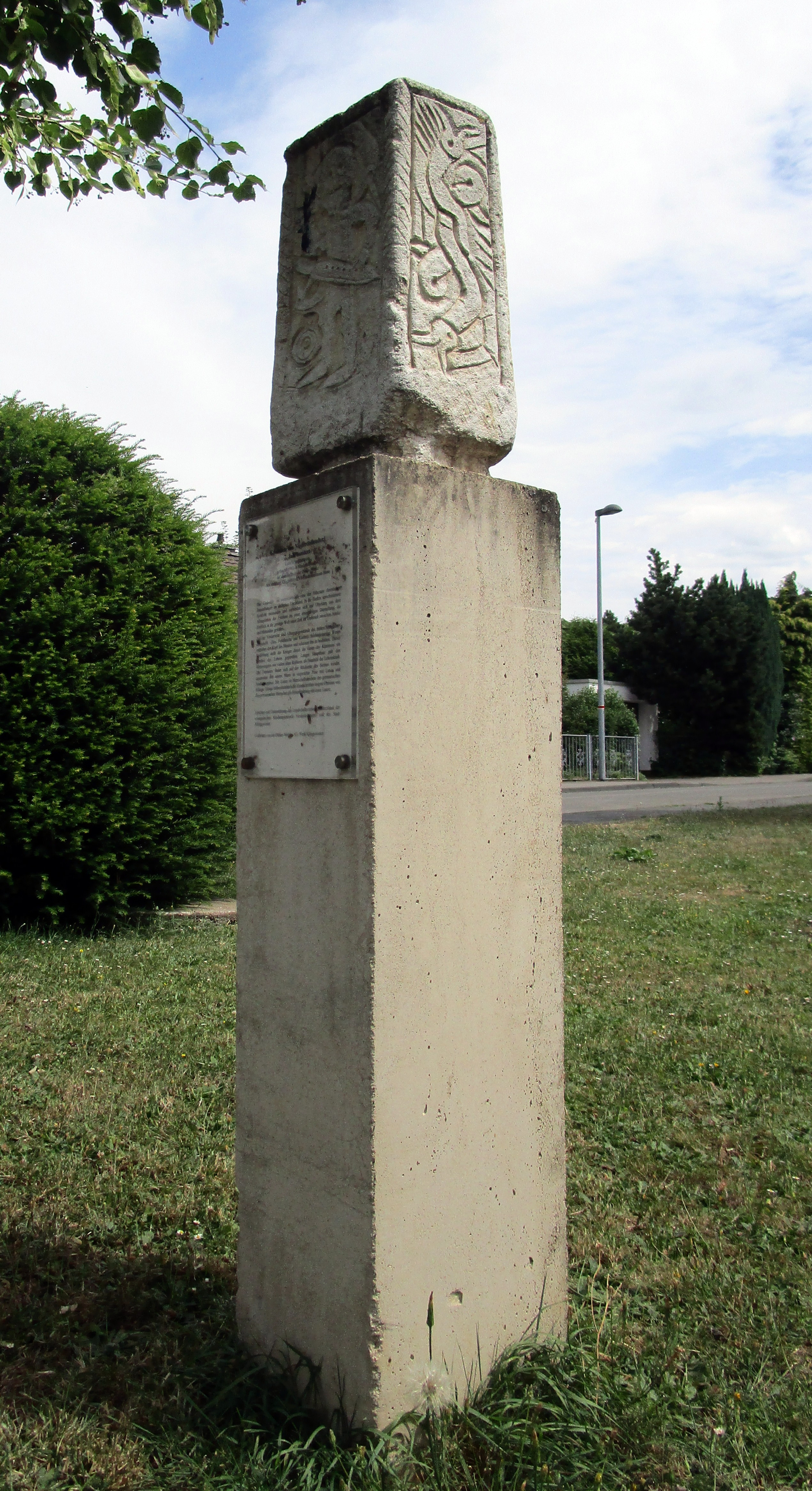
A reproduction of the stone in Friedenstraße (in front of the Protestant church), Niederdollendorf, erected in 2016.

== See also ==
- Hornhausen stones
- Landelinus buckle
- Moselkern stele
- Stuttgart Psalter
