= Carndonagh stones =

Coordinates: 55°15′00″N 7°16′19″W

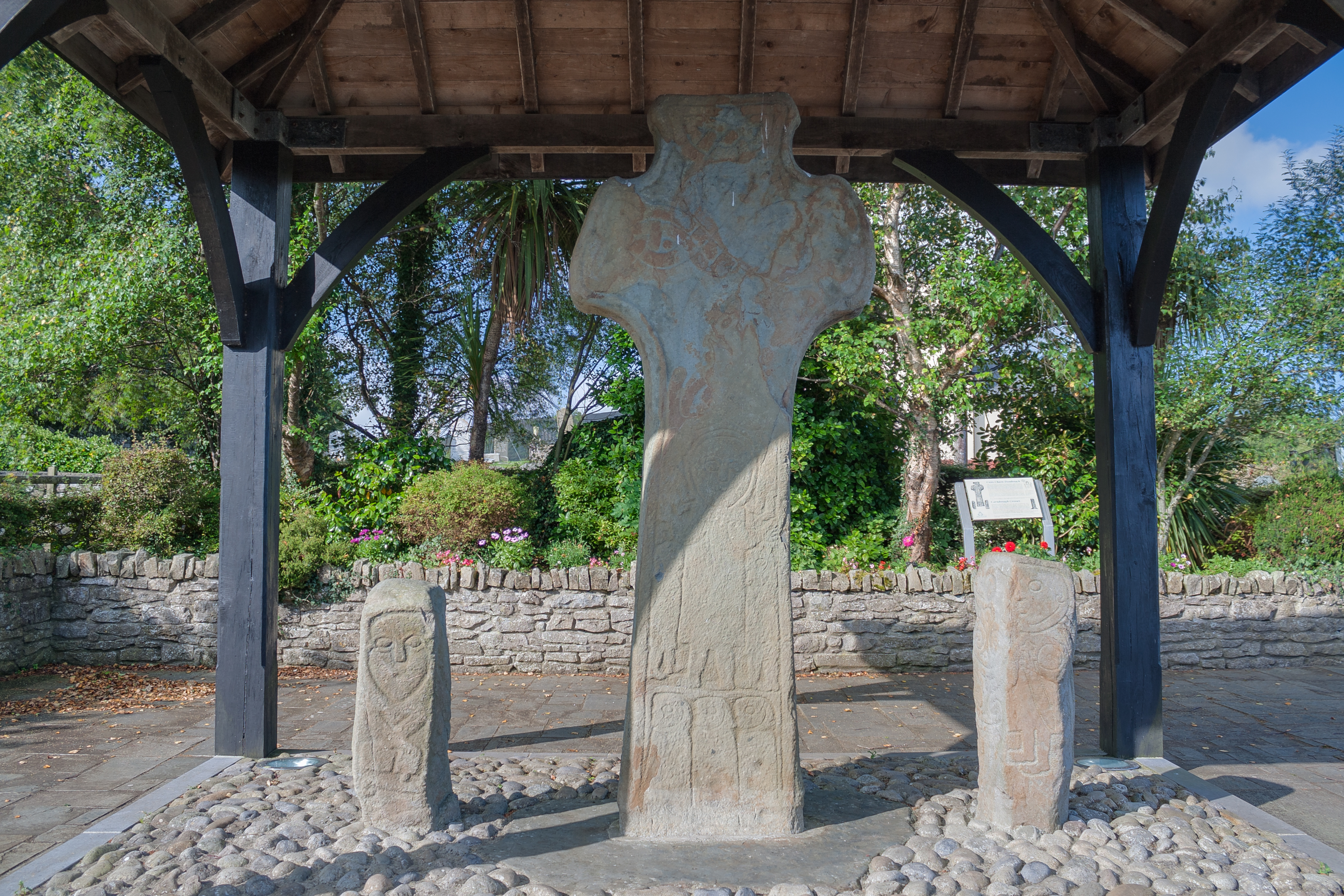
High cross and attendant pillars.

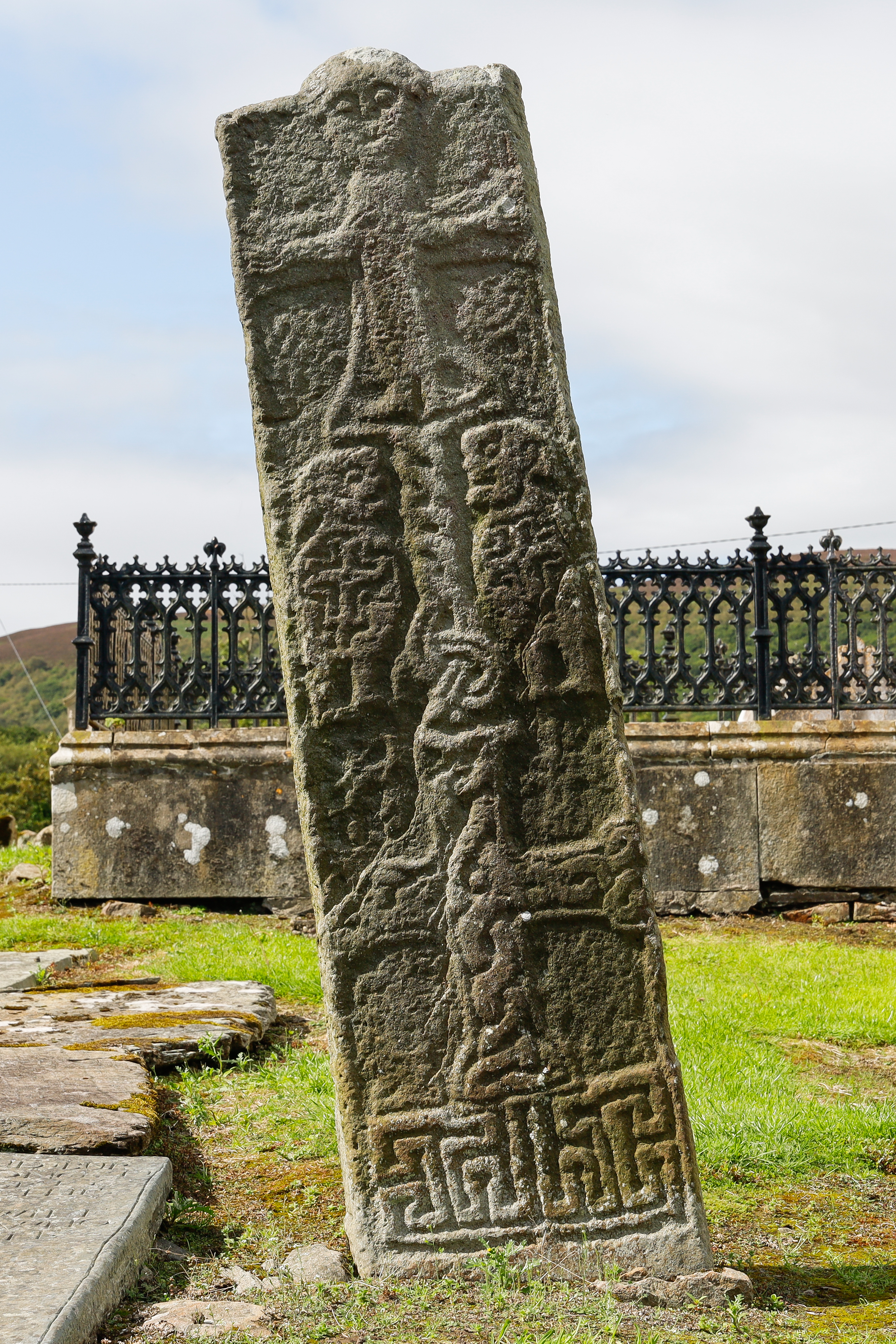
The east face of the marigold stone.

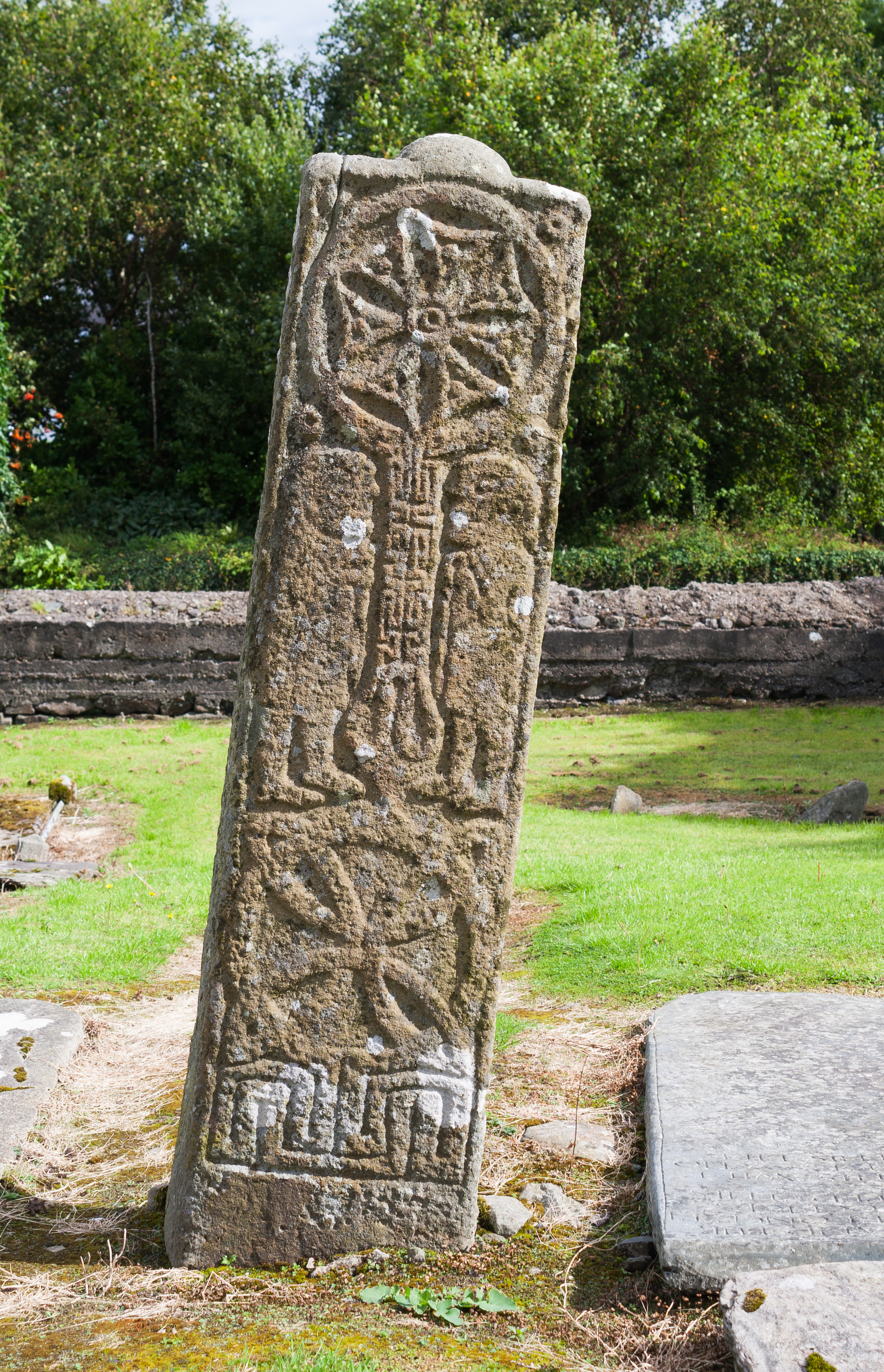
The west face of the marigold stone.

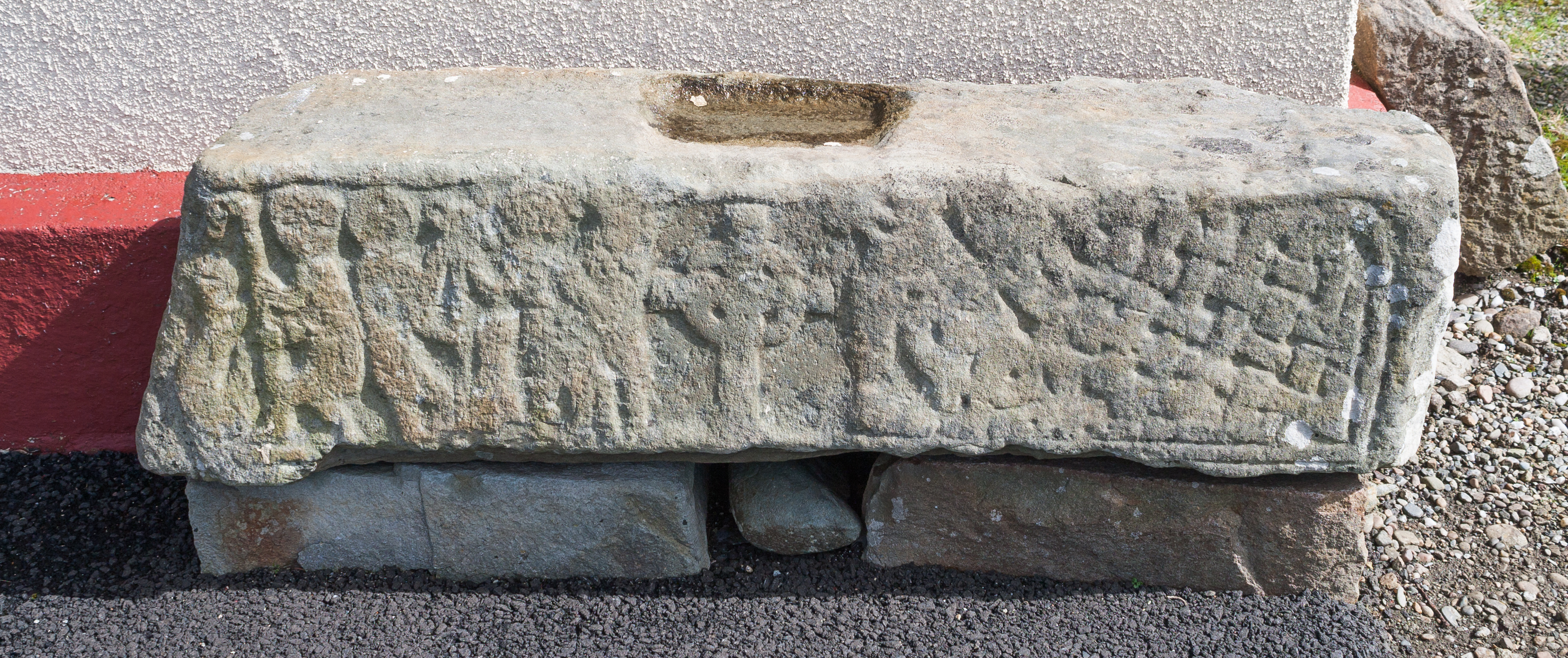
The decorated lintel.

The Carndonagh stones are a set of five sculpted stones in the town of Carndonagh, County Donegal. All five stones are on the grounds of Donagh Church. The group consists of one free-standing high cross with two smaller, attendant pillars; a free-standing pillar known as the "Marigold Stone"; and a decorated door lintel. The pieces apart from the lintel are thought, on the basis of their stylistic similarity, to be roughly contemporaneous. These stones are generally now dated between the 9th and 10th century, though a minority date them to the 7th century on the basis of stylistic comparisons with the Book of Durrow.

The north pillar has a carving of a seated harpist and a outline of a warrior. The south pillar has a figure similar to the Janus (two headed) figure found on Boa Island. The Marigold Stone in the nearby graveyard is 5.5 feet high and 1.4 feet wide and is dated to around to the year 600. The name comes from the seven petalled flower on its west side. The east side shows Christ with arms outstretched and a tripartite knot at its base.

French scholar Françoise Henry (who dated the stone to the 7th century) made the Carndonagh high cross famous by citing it prominently in her theory of the origin of Insular high crosses. She believed that high crosses gradually emerged from carved slabs (such as the St Mura Cross at Fahan) and that the Carndonagh high cross "marks the final victory in the attempt to free the cross from the slab". This theory gained few supporters, with later archaeological evidence substantially refuting it. Scottish archaeologist Robert B. K. Stevenson sharply criticised her interpretation of the Carndonagh stones.
