= Hornhausen =

Village in Germany

- Stadtteil of Oschersleben
- Interactive map of Hornhausen
- Location within Germany Location within Saxony-Anhalt
- Coordinates: 52°3′1″N 11°10′37″E
- Country: Germany
- State: Saxony-Anhalt
- District: Börde
- Town: Oschersleben

Area
  - Total: 18.80 km^{2} (7.26 sq mi)
- Elevation: 81 m (266 ft)

Population (2006-12-31)
  - Total: 1,711
  - Density: 91.01/km^{2} (235.7/sq mi)
- Time zone: UTC+01:00 (CET)
  - Summer (DST): UTC+02:00 (CEST)
- Postal codes: 39387
- Dialling codes: 03949
- Vehicle registration: BK
- Website: www.oscherslebenbode.de/ hornhausen.htm

Hornhausen is a village and a former municipality in the Börde district in Saxony-Anhalt, Germany. Since 1 July 2009, it is part of the town Oschersleben. Between 1874 and 1914, the Hornhausen stones were found here.
