= List of disease outbreaks in the United States =

This is a list of notable disease outbreaks in the United States:

== 1700s ==
- 1775–1782 North American smallpox epidemic
- 1789–1790 influenza epidemic
- 1793 Philadelphia yellow fever epidemic

== 1800s ==
- 1837 Great Plains smallpox epidemic
- 1849-1850 Tennessee cholera epidemic
- 1853 yellow fever epidemic
- 1862 Pacific Northwest smallpox epidemic
- 1876 yellow fever epidemic
- 1878 Lower Mississippi Valley yellow fever epidemic

== 1900s ==
- 1900–1904 San Francisco plague epidemic
- 1916 New York City polio epidemic
- 1918–1930 Encephalitis lethargica epidemic
- 1924 Los Angeles pneumonic plague outbreak
- 1924–1925 Minnesota smallpox epidemic
- 1947 New York City smallpox outbreak
- 1962-1965 rubella epidemic
- 1976 Philadelphia Legionnaires' disease outbreak
- 1976 swine flu outbreak
- 1987 Carroll County cryptosporidiosis outbreak
- 1990–1991 Philadelphia measles outbreak
- 1993 Four Corners hantavirus outbreak
- 1992–1993 Jack in the Box E. coli outbreak
- 1993 Milwaukee cryptosporidiosis outbreak
- 1996 Odwalla E. coli outbreak

== 2000s ==
- 2003 Chi-Chi's hepatitis A outbreak
- 2003 Midwest monkeypox outbreak
- 2006 North American E. coli O157:H7 outbreak in spinach
- 2006 North American E. coli O157:H7 outbreaks
- 2008 United States salmonellosis outbreak
- 2009 swine flu pandemic in the United States
- 2011 United States listeriosis outbreak
- 2012 outbreak of Salmonella
- 2012–2013 United States flu season
- 2014 enterovirus D68 outbreak
- 2015 Bronx Legionnaires' disease outbreaks
- 2015 United States E. coli outbreak
- 2015 United States H5N2 outbreak
- 2016 United States Elizabethkingia outbreak
- 2017–2018 United States flu season
- 2018 United States adenovirus outbreak
- 2019 New York measles outbreak
- 2019 Pacific Northwest measles outbreak
- 2019 United States hepatitis A outbreak
- 2019–2020 United States flu season
- 2020-2023 COVID-19 (national emergency terminated April 2023)
- 2022–2023 mpox outbreak in New York (state)
- 2022–2023 United States P. aeruginosa outbreak in eye drops

== See also ==
- List of epidemics and pandemics
- List of disasters in the United States by death toll
