= 1853 yellow fever epidemic =

Gulf Coast and Caribbean disease outbreak

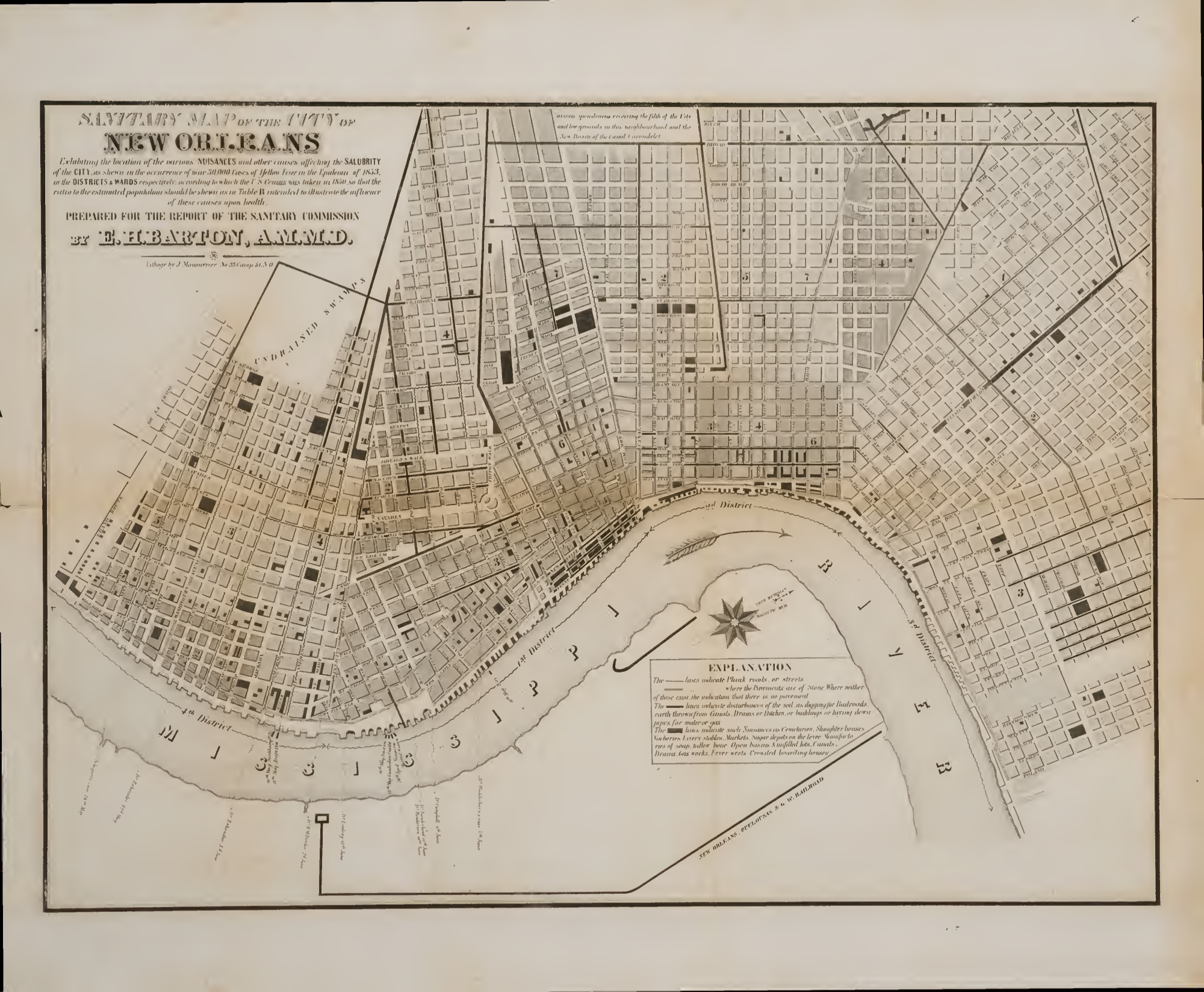
- "Barton's Sanitary Map of New Orleans" from Report of the Sanitary Commission of New Orleans on the epidemic yellow fever of 1853 (U.S. National Library of Medicine)
- Location: Gulf Coast, Caribbean
- Deaths: 10,000+

The 1853 yellow fever epidemic of the Gulf of Mexico and Caribbean islands resulted in thousands of fatalities. Over 9,000 people died of yellow fever in New Orleans alone, around 8% of the total population. Many of the dead in New Orleans were recent Irish immigrants living in difficult conditions and without any acquired immunity. There was a stark racial disparity in mortality rates: "7.4% of whites who contracted yellow fever died, while only 0.2% of blacks perished from the disease." As historian Kathryn Olivarius observed in Necropolis: Disease, Power, and Capitalism in the Cotton Kingdom, "For enslaved blacks, the story was different. Immunity protected them from yellow fever, but as embodied capital, they saw the social and monetary value of their acclimation accrued to their white owners."

The epidemic was an international news story. A newspaper in Cambridge, England, published this evocative description of the scene in the Crescent City:

The most deplorable havoc is being made in New Orleans by the yellow fever. Thousands have been carried off by its ravages, and every day adds 200 more to the ghastly record. The dead are buried in trenches by chain gangs of negroes, hired at a guinea an hour. The New Orleans Crescent, after describing the horrible system of burial adopted adds, "The stoical negroes, too, who are hired at 5 dollars per hour to assist in the work of interment, stagger under the stifling fumes, and can only be kept at their work by deep and continuous potations of the fire 'water.'...And thus, what with the songs and the obscene jests of the gravediggers, the buzzing of the flies, the sing-song cries of the huxter-women vending their confections, the hoarse oaths of the men who drive the dead carts, the merry whistle of the boys, and the stifling reek from the scores of blackened corpses, the day wears apace, the work of sepulture is done, and night draws the curtain." In the meantime, amusements, regattas, balls, &c. are proceeding as usual, as if no such appalling pestilence were in the doomed city.

One of the most popular treatments in New Orleans was by Marie Laveau, whose practice of voodoo and/or the healing arts with yellow fever was so esteemed that "a committee of citizens was appointed to wait upon her, and beg her to lend her aid to the feversmitten, numbers of whom she saved." In addition to death toll in New Orleans:

- 1,100 people died in the vicinity of Mobile, Alabama. A volunteer public-health service in the Mobile area called the Can't Get Away Club provided healthcare to the afflicted. Josiah C. Nott had predicted a severe outbreak "simply from the fact that I had never known the disease early in the season to attack Vera Cruz, West India Islands and New Orleans" without it being a season of severe disease.
- Navigating inland, yellow jack (as it was sometimes called) came to the town of Natchez, Mississippi in July 1853, killing 5% of the population (over 300 residents). In September a local newspaper reported, "Everybody has left town that could, and but very few are left. Business is at a dead standstill. However, two dry goods stores were open on Main St. yesterday; most of the merchants have sought temporary locations in the countryside or neighboring villages. A greater panic never occurred before from a similar cause among any people. Our streets look desolate indeed, you may walk an hour sometimes and not meet a dozen persons." Correspondence indicates that slave trader C.M. Rutherford and trader-turned-planter Rice C. Ballard intended to file an insurance claim on a 23-year-old slave named Charles Craig, who had been killed by yellow fever.
- Yellow fever killed over 500 in Galveston, Texas, in 1853. It arrived in Pensacola in July on the steamer Vixen and by October had killed 260.
- There are many 1853 yellow fever victims in the Old Town Key West Cemetery.
- The fever was at Port Royal, Jamaica in April through June, killing 10 and then vanished; and in September it landed in Bermuda.

Multiple books were written by contemporary doctors and public health officials about the epidemic; the New Orleans city directory of 1854 included a long essay on the series of major epidemics suffered by the city since before the Louisiana Purchase. The fall preceding the 1853 outbreak there were a small number of cases in the Caribbean; the Jamaican cases were documented, in part, in The Lancet by a surgeon of the Royal Navy.

== See also ==
- History of yellow fever
- List of notable disease outbreaks in the United States
- Lower Mississippi Valley yellow fever epidemic of 1878
- 1853 in the United States
