= Senator Perdue (disambiguation) =

David Perdue (born 1949) was a U.S. Senator from Georgia from 2015-2021.

Senator Perdue may also refer to:

- Bev Perdue (born 1947), North Carolina State Senate
- Sonny Perdue (born 1946), Georgia State Senate
