= David Perdue =

American politician and diplomat (born 1949)

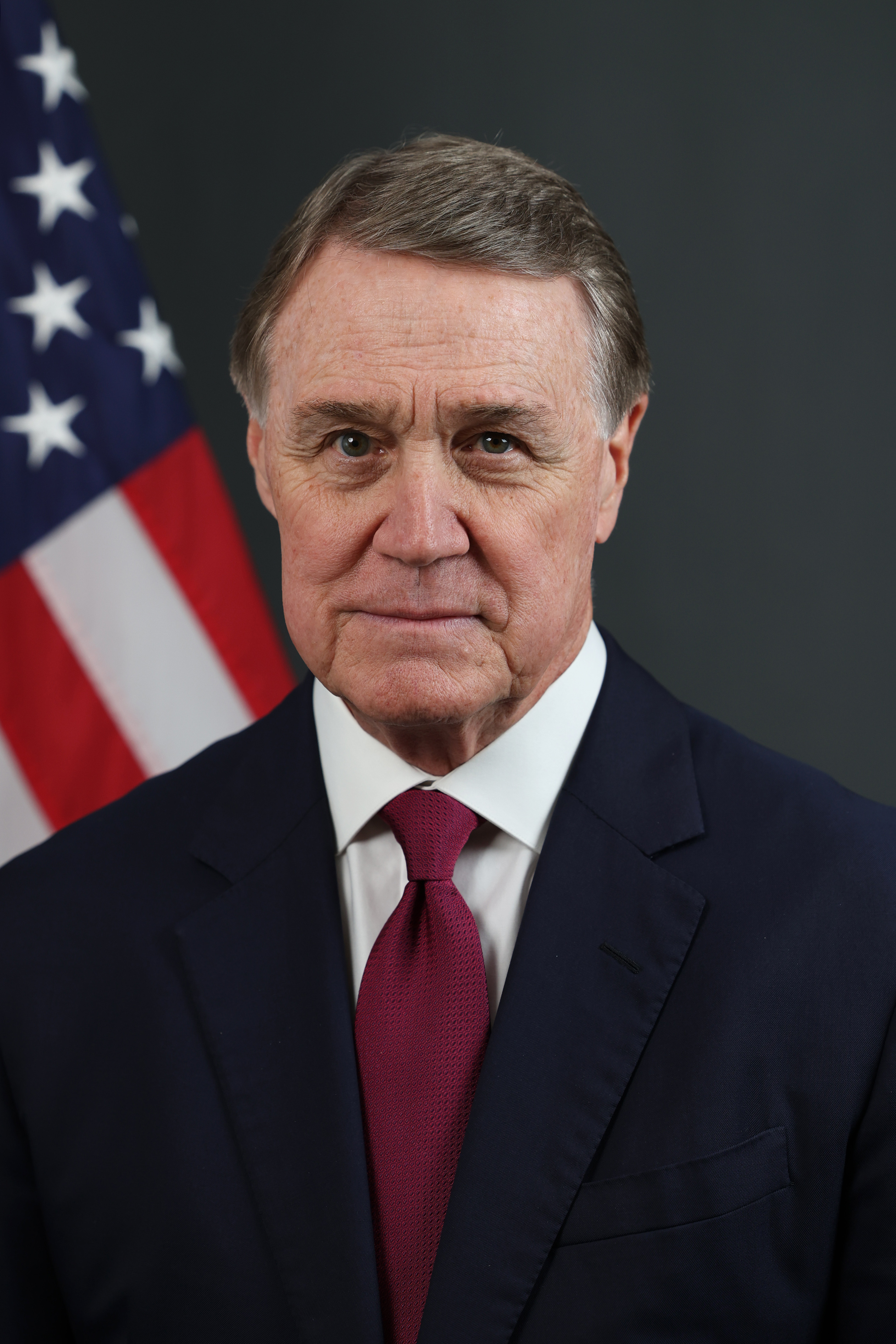
- Official portrait, 2025

14th United States Ambassador to China
- Incumbent
- Assumed office May 16, 2025
- President: Donald Trump
- Preceded by: R. Nicholas Burns

United States Senator from Georgia
- In office January 3, 2015 – January 3, 2021
- Preceded by: Saxby Chambliss
- Succeeded by: Jon Ossoff

Personal details
- Born: David Alfred Perdue Jr. December 10, 1949 (age 76) Macon, Georgia, U.S.
- Party: Republican
- Spouse: Bonnie Dunn (m. 1972)
- Children: 3
- Relatives: Sonny Perdue (cousin)
- Education: United States Air Force Academy (attended); Georgia Institute of Technology (BS, MS)
- Perdue's voice Perdue on government overspending. Recorded October 31, 2017

Chinese name
- Chinese: 庞德伟
Transcriptions
Standard Mandarin
- Hanyu Pinyin: Páng Dé Wěi

David Alfred Perdue Jr. (born December 10, 1949) is an American citizen diplomat, politician, and businessman serving as the 14th United States ambassador to China since 2025. A member of the Republican Party, Perdue previously served as a United States senator for Georgia from 2015 to 2021. He was an unsuccessful candidate for governor of Georgia in 2022.

After 20 years as a management consultant, Perdue became the senior vice president for Reebok, eventually becoming CEO. He later joined PillowTex, a North Carolina textile company; the company went bankrupt and folded shortly after his departure in 2006. He subsequently became CEO of Dollar General.

Perdue first ran for the U.S. Senate in 2014, defeating Democratic nominee Michelle Nunn, daughter of former U.S. senator Sam Nunn. Perdue ran for reelection in 2020, losing to Democrat Jon Ossoff, a former investigative journalist and filmmaker, in a January 5, 2021, runoff election. After the November 2021 presidential election, Perdue called for the resignation of Georgia's top elections official and claimed without evidence that there were unspecified "failures" in the election. He later supported a lawsuit by Trump allies seeking to overturn the election results, and asserted without evidence during his 2022 gubernatorial election campaign that his 2020 Senate election was stolen.

Perdue was linked to the 2020 congressional insider trading scandal for allegations of STOCK Act violations. The basis was stocks he sold before the 2020 stock market crash allegedly using knowledge from a closed Senate meeting. The U.S. Department of Justice closed its inquiry in mid-2020 without bringing charges. Perdue unsuccessfully sought the Republican nomination in the 2022 Georgia gubernatorial election against incumbent Brian Kemp.

On December 5, 2024, President-elect Donald Trump named Perdue as his nominee for United States ambassador to China. On April 29, 2025, the U.S. Senate confirmed Perdue by a vote of 67 to 21, and he presented his credentials on May 16, 2025.

== Early life and education ==
David Perdue was born in Macon, Georgia, the son of David Alfred Perdue Sr., and the former Gervaise Wynn, both schoolteachers. His father, a Democrat, was the elected superintendent of schools for Houston County, Georgia from 1961 to 1980.

Perdue was raised in Warner Robins, Georgia, and graduated from Northside High School in 1968,. He went to college for one year at the United States Air Force Academy starting in June 1968, after receiving an appointment from Congressman Jack Brinkley of Georgia, but dropped out after earning low grades. In 1969 Perdue wrote to Congressman Brinkley that he wanted to quit the Air Force Academy writing, "I have made a mistake and I do not want this type of career."

Perdue later transferred to Georgia Tech, where he earned a Bachelor of Science degree in industrial engineering in 1972, and a Master of Science degree in operations research in 1975.

Perdue is the first cousin of former governor of Georgia and former U.S. secretary of agriculture Sonny Perdue by their grandfather George Ervin Perdue Sr. As such, Perdue is not related to any descendent of the family that founded and operates Perdue Farms.

== Business career ==
Perdue began his career in 1972 at Kurt Salmon Associates, an international consulting firm, where he worked for 12 years as a management consultant, leaving in 1984. From 1991 to 1992, Perdue was a managing director at international clothing company Gitano Group Inc. in Singapore. In 1992, Perdue took a position as senior vice president of Asia operations for Sara Lee Corporation. During his tenure, Perdue was involved in sourcing suppliers in China and Hong Kong while the company closed dozens of plants in the U.S., four of them in Georgia. Two years later, Perdue became senior vice president of operations at Haggar Clothing, increasing international production in lower-cost countries to 75 percent of the company's operations.

In 1998, Perdue joined Reebok as a senior vice president, eventually rising to president and CEO of the Reebok Brand. He is credited with rejuvenating its sneaker line. Perdue negotiated a contract with the National Football League that a former Reebok executive called "revolutionary" for repositioning the company's shoe brand.

Perdue left Reebok in June 2002 to become the CEO of PillowTex, a North Carolina textile company. The company had recently emerged from bankruptcy with a heavy debt load and an underfunded pension liability. Unable to obtain additional funding from the company's investors or find a buyer for the company, he left the company in 2003 after nine months on the job and $1.7 million in compensation. An internal auditor noted that Perdue's long absences from its North Carolina Headquarters was "terrible for morale. We felt he'd given up." In July 2003, Pillowtex announced it would go out of business, leaving 7,650 workers out of work nationwide.

After leaving Pillowtex, Perdue became CEO of Dollar General. Before he joined the company, it had recently overstated profits by $100 million and paid $162 million to settle shareholder lawsuits. Perdue overhauled the company's inventory line and logistics network and updated its marketing strategy. After initially closing hundreds of stores, the company doubled its stock price and opened 2,600 new stores. During his four years as CEO, almost 2,500 individual employment cases were filed in federal court against the company, compared to 76 in the prior four years.

Perdue is credited for arranging the sale of Dollar General in 2007 to private equity investors KKR. In 2007 and 2008, he received $42 million in compensation from Dollar General. After the sale to KKR, Dollar General faced shareholder lawsuits alleging that Perdue and other executives undersold shareholders; it paid $40 million to settle those lawsuits.

From 2007 to 2009, Perdue worked as a senior consultant for Indian chemical and textile conglomerate Gujarat Heavy Chemicals Ltd. In July 2010, his cousin, then-governor Sonny Perdue, appointed him as a director of the Georgia Ports Authority. In April 2011, he started Perdue Partners, an Atlanta-based global trading firm, with his cousin, whose term had ended in January 2011, and two former state officials.

In December 2012, Perdue Partners acquired Benton Express, an Atlanta-based logistics company, and renamed it Benton Global. In February 2013, Benton Global began hauling cargo directly from the port, rather than contracting out for trucking services. Perdue left the ports board in mid-2013. Benton Global closed abruptly in 2015.

From 2010 to 2014, Perdue served on the board of directors of the data marketing firm Cardlytics. He acquired 75,000 shares in compensation for his board service. When Cardlytics became publicly owned, Perdue made $6 million from the shares.

The Atlanta Journal-Constitution has described Perdue as having a "mixed" business record, but says that he was "known on Wall Street as a turnaround specialist who helps revive brands and reap rewards for investors." Most of his jobs involved outsourcing jobs overseas, and he said in a deposition, "I spent most of my career doing that."

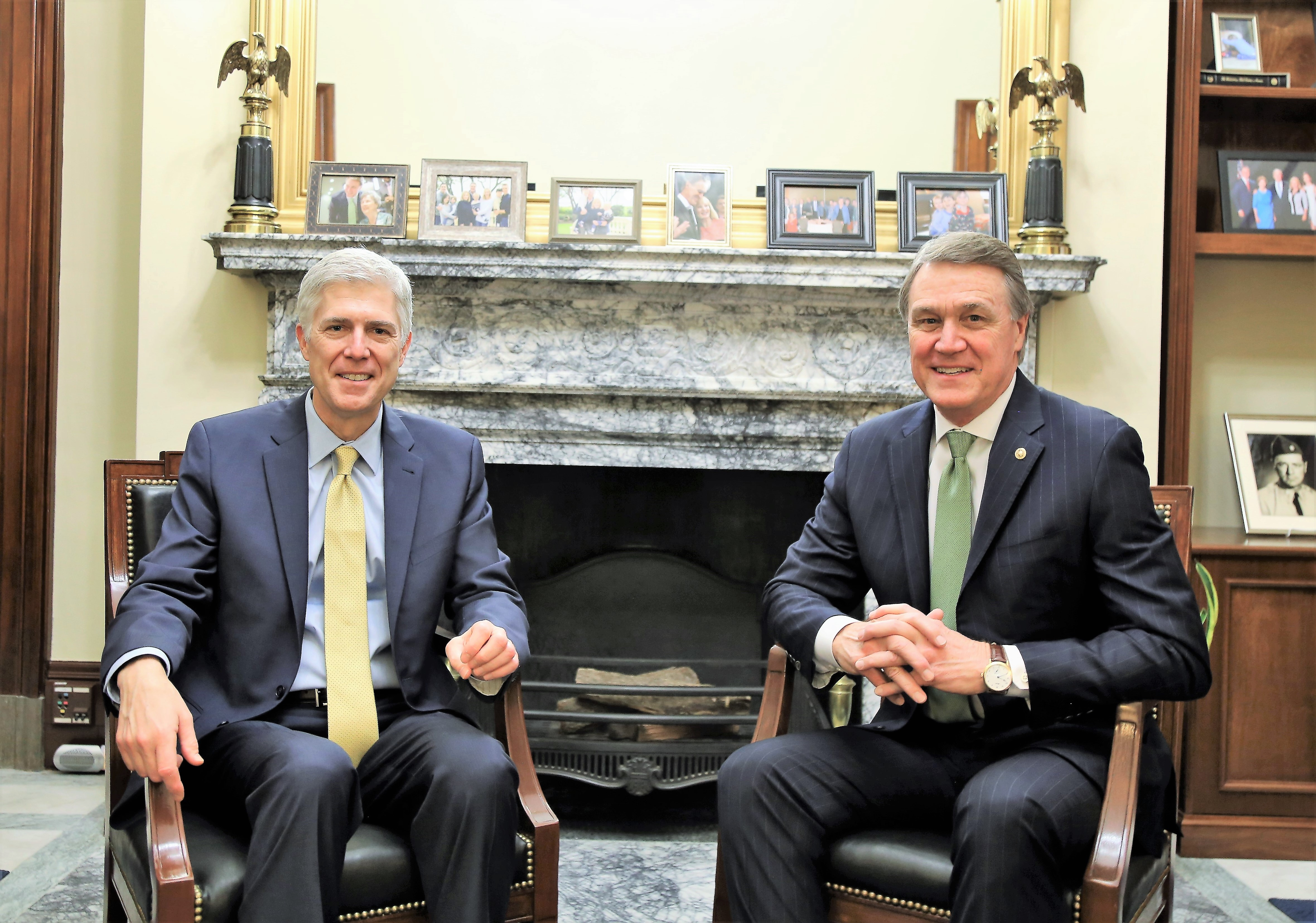
Perdue with Neil Gorsuch in 2017

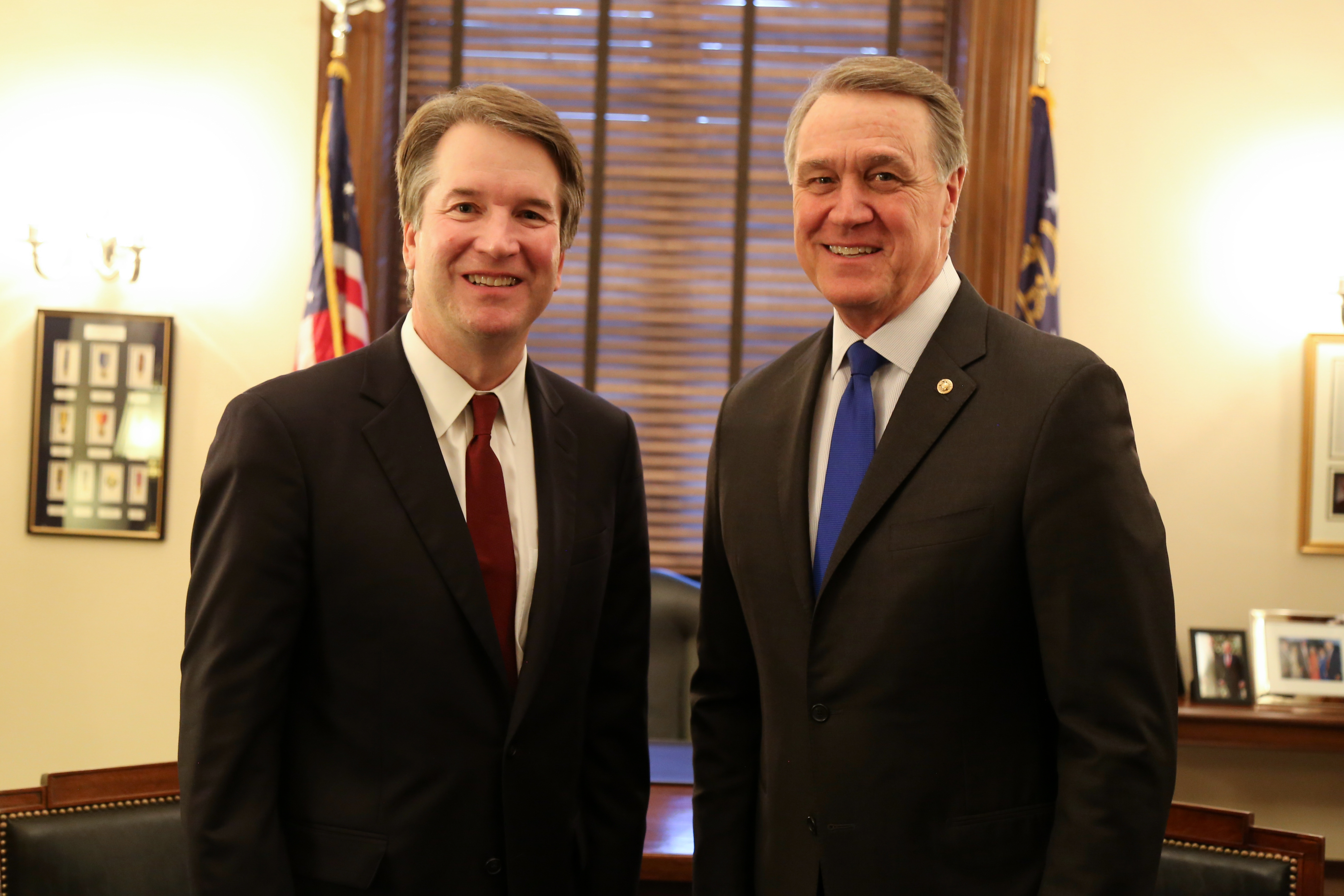
Perdue with Brett Kavanaugh in 2018

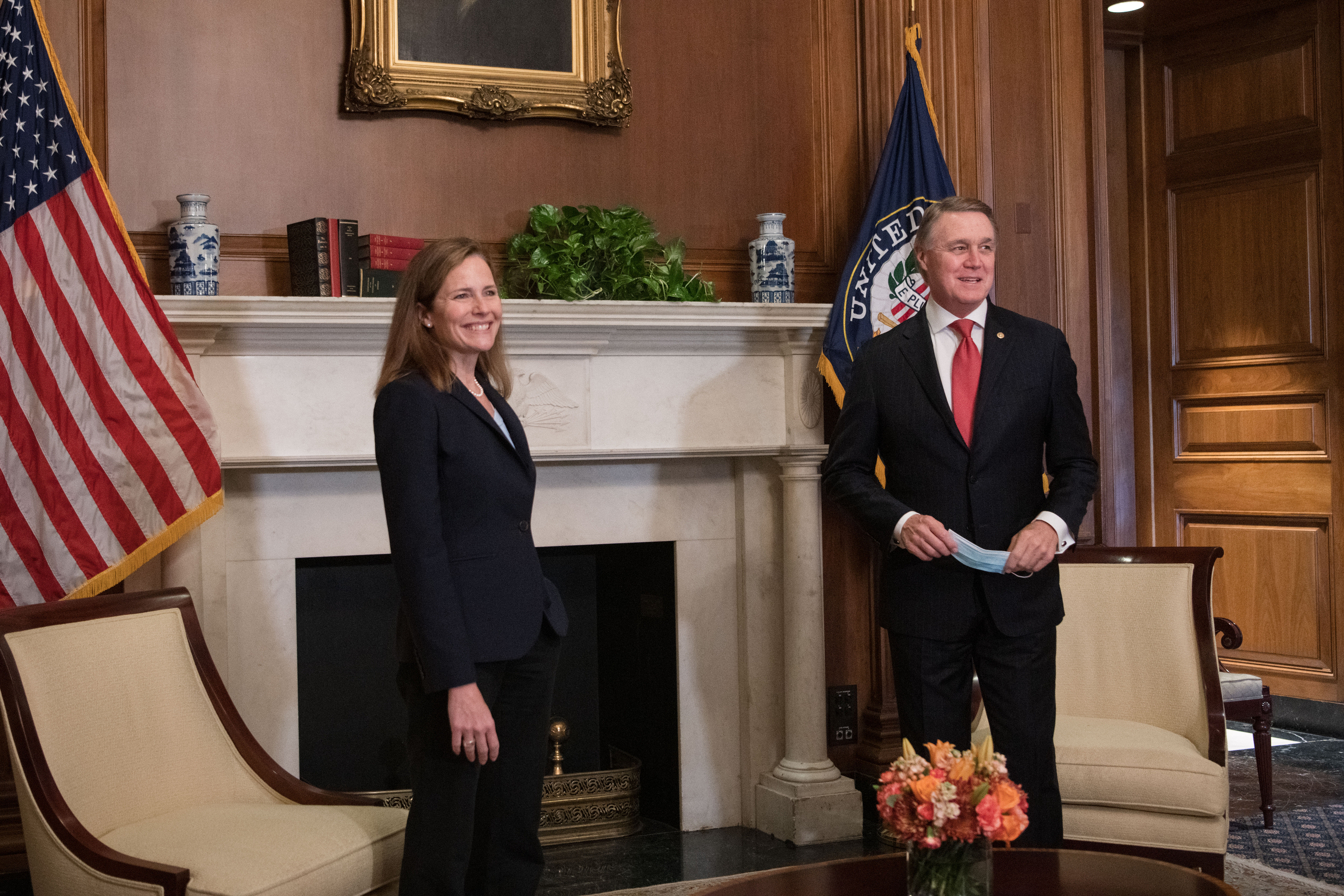
Perdue with Amy Coney Barrett in 2020 in the Mansfield room in the Senate

== U.S. Senate ==
=== 2014 U.S. Senate campaign ===
Perdue touted his business experience, and particularly his experience at Dollar General, in running for political office as a Republican candidate. According to Perdue, "We added about 2,200 stores, created almost 20,000 jobs and doubled the value of that company in a very short period of time. Not because of me, but because we listened to our customers and employees." He was endorsed by the National Federation of Independent Business.

Perdue's political opponents targeted his business career during the campaign, specifically for outsourcing work offshore. He said he was "proud of" finding lower-cost labor for some companies. Critics noted that he had contributed to a total of thousands of jobs lost following the final closure of Pillowtex, while Perdue left the company after nine months with a nearly $2 million buyout.

Perdue's campaign paid a $30,000 fine due to violations in fundraising reports from the 2014 election. The penalty came after an FEC auditor found the 2014 campaign received at least $117,000 in prohibited contributions and more than $325,000 that exceeded legal limits on campaign donations. Perdue's campaign had raised nearly $14 million, setting records for funds raised in a Georgia Senate election.

The race was considered competitive. Perdue defeated Democratic nominee Michelle Nunn 52.89% to 45.21%.

In June 2016, at the Faith and Freedom Coalition's Road to Majority conference, Perdue said, "We should pray for Barack Obama. But I think we need to be very specific about how we pray. We should pray like Psalms 109:8 says. It says, 'Let his days be few, and let another have his office'". In a statement, Perdue's office clarified: "He in no way wishes harm to our president and everyone in the room understood that".

On October 13, 2018, Perdue visited the Georgia Tech campus to campaign for gubernatorial candidate Brian Kemp. During his visit, a Georgia Tech student approached Perdue and asked him a question about voter suppression. Perdue snatched away the student's phone, which was recording the exchange. The student filed civil suit, alleging unlawful battery.

Perdue became Georgia's senior senator after Johnny Isakson resigned on December 31, 2019.

With a net worth of $15.8 million, as calculated by Roll Call based on financial disclosures, Perdue was one of the wealthiest members of the Senate as of February 2018.

In 2019, Perdue wrote Treasury Secretary Steven Mnuchin a letter expressing concern that owners of professional sports teams could not take advantage of certain tax breaks. Sports team owners and their family members have donated over $425,000 to Perdue's political campaigns. Perdue requested Mnuchin change the regulation to benefit the owners, but Mnuchin made no change. Perdue's 2020 campaign attributed the request to Perdue's history of having a leadership position in a sportswear company such as Reebok.

In 2019, Perdue sold his Washington house for $1.8 million to a governor of the Financial Industry Regulatory Authority, which the Senate Banking Committee that Perdue sits on oversees and FINRA lobbies. According to one agent, the sale was about $140,000 above market price. The buyer disputed the agent's claim that Perdue received an "above market price" with an appraisal that determined that Perdue actually sold for slightly under market value. Also, a fifth expert stated that the price Perdue received was "squarely fair market value". And finally, Perdue used a real estate agent and had no interaction with the FIRA official, does not know the individual, and has never spoken to the individual.

=== Stock trading controversies ===
During his time in office, Perdue was the Senate's most prolific trader of stocks, funds or shares, making almost one third of all trades among members, roughly equivalent to the combined sum of trades conducted by the second- to sixth-most active traders in the Senate. Many trades were in companies with interests in the committees Perdue sat on, including banks, cybersecurity firms, and defense firms. For example, as part of the Senate Banking Committee, he regularly traded in stock of the Regions Financial bank in 2017 and early 2018. During that period, Perdue co-sponsored a Senate bill that would reduce financial regulations on medium-sized banks such as Regions. His proposed deregulations became law in May 2018, and Region's stock had risen by 35% since Perdue bought its shares. Perdue's office maintains that all of his stock trading activities were conducted independently through his broker.

In January and February 2016, Perdue invested in Halyard stocks shortly before and after the Senate first held a hearing on the opioid epidemic in the United States. Halyard sold medical devices that could assist in providing alternatives to opioids. The stock was worth up to $150,000. Perdue sold the stock around seven months later, profiting between 33% and 54%. Perdue reiterated that his broker operated independently from him.

In February 2017, Perdue attempted to remove regulations the Consumer Financial Protection Bureau had imposed on the prepaid debit card industry. The regulations were not removed, but they were scaled down, with Perdue taking credit in May 2017 for having solicited "significant concessions". From June 2017 to April 2019, he actively invested in card processor First Data, which held major interests and power in the prepaid debit card industry. The Daily Beast reported that Perdue's transactions of First Data stocks "coincided with both policy announcements affecting the company and a major merger that sent its stock price soaring." Perdue's office said that the transactions were done by his financial advisers, and that they operated independently from him. His office also denied that he knew of the merger before it happened.

Shortly before becoming chairman of the Armed Services Subcommittee on Seapower in January 2019, with jurisdiction over the Navy, Perdue bought $190,000 of stock in BWX Technologies, which builds nuclear power components for submarines. Later, Perdue secured almost $5 billion in the 2020 National Defense Authorization Act to build Virginia-class nuclear submarines built with BWX parts. He profited between $15,000 and $50,000 (according to his financial filings) when he sold the shares while writing the bill. His office reiterated that he was not personally involved in the stock-trading decisions.

On January 23, 2020, Perdue directed his financial advisers to sell over $1 million in stock of the finance firm Cardlytics weeks before its shares fell significantly. Two days before the sale, Cardlytics's CEO sent Perdue an email mentioning "upcoming changes", then later said he had sent the email to the wrong person. The Department of Justice investigated this incident, and concluded that Perdue had not engaged in insider trading. After Cardlytics' shares fell, he bought between $200,000 and $500,000 of their shares in March; these shares more than quadrupled their value by November 2020.

On January 24, 2020, Perdue bought around $65,000 of stock in DuPont, a company that makes personal protective equipment, on the same day as a private Senate briefing on the spread of COVID-19. Over the next few months, he bought and sold around $5.8 million and $5.6 million worth of stocks, respectively. Perdue bought up to $245,000 in stocks of the pharmaceutical company Pfizer, and sold up to $165,000 in stocks of the casino Caesars Entertainment, which closed its doors during the pandemic. His stock-trading activity sharply increased in March 2020. In May 2020, after his portfolio was scrutinized, Perdue announced that his financial advisers would no longer buy and sell individual stocks. He was criticized for his stock-trading during the coronavirus pandemic, with allegations of insider trading. Perdue has said advisers made the trades without his influence.

Perdue has asserted that the Senate Ethics Committee investigated the incident and in June 2020 privately concluded that it "did not find evidence that [Perdue's] actions violated federal law, Senate Rules, or standards of conduct". But as of December 2020, the Ethics Committee has not disclosed such an investigation.

=== COVID-19 pandemic ===
In late March 2020, regarding the COVID-19 pandemic, Perdue urged the public to "follow the advice of public health officials: stay home if you are sick; wash your hands frequently with soap and water; keep a safe distance from others. If you are experiencing symptoms, call your health care provider right away." In May, June and July 2020, he called for Americans to wear masks to manage the outbreak. With regard to pandemic's effects, Perdue has assisted small businesses by joining the Paycheck Protection Program.

In May 2020, Perdue argued that the United States "had ordinary flu seasons with more deaths" than the COVID-19 outbreak in the country. At the time, there were over 80,000 deaths due to COVID-19 in the country, while the average deaths for flu over the previous 10 years was under 40,000 deaths per year, with 61,000 deaths in 2017–2018. As predicted by medical experts, COVID-19 is much deadlier than the flu, as the death toll in the United States rose above 240,000 within the year.

Also in May 2020, when medical experts criticized Georgia for ending lockdowns too early, Perdue declared support for the end of the lockdown: "We've got to get this economy open again. We're on the back side of the cycle." Georgia experienced a spike in COVID-19 cases in July and August 2020.

Perdue has praised Trump's response to the pandemic. Asked why he criticized Obama for his response to the Ebola outbreak in 2014 (with four cases and two deaths in the country) but praised Trump's response to the coronavirus in 2020, he said, "It's a totally different situation." In September 2020, after the release of recordings from February and March in which Trump admitted he intentionally downplayed the severity of the coronavirus threat, Perdue said Trump was "trying to manage the psyche of the country" and to "look at what he did."

=== 2020–21 U.S. Senate campaign ===
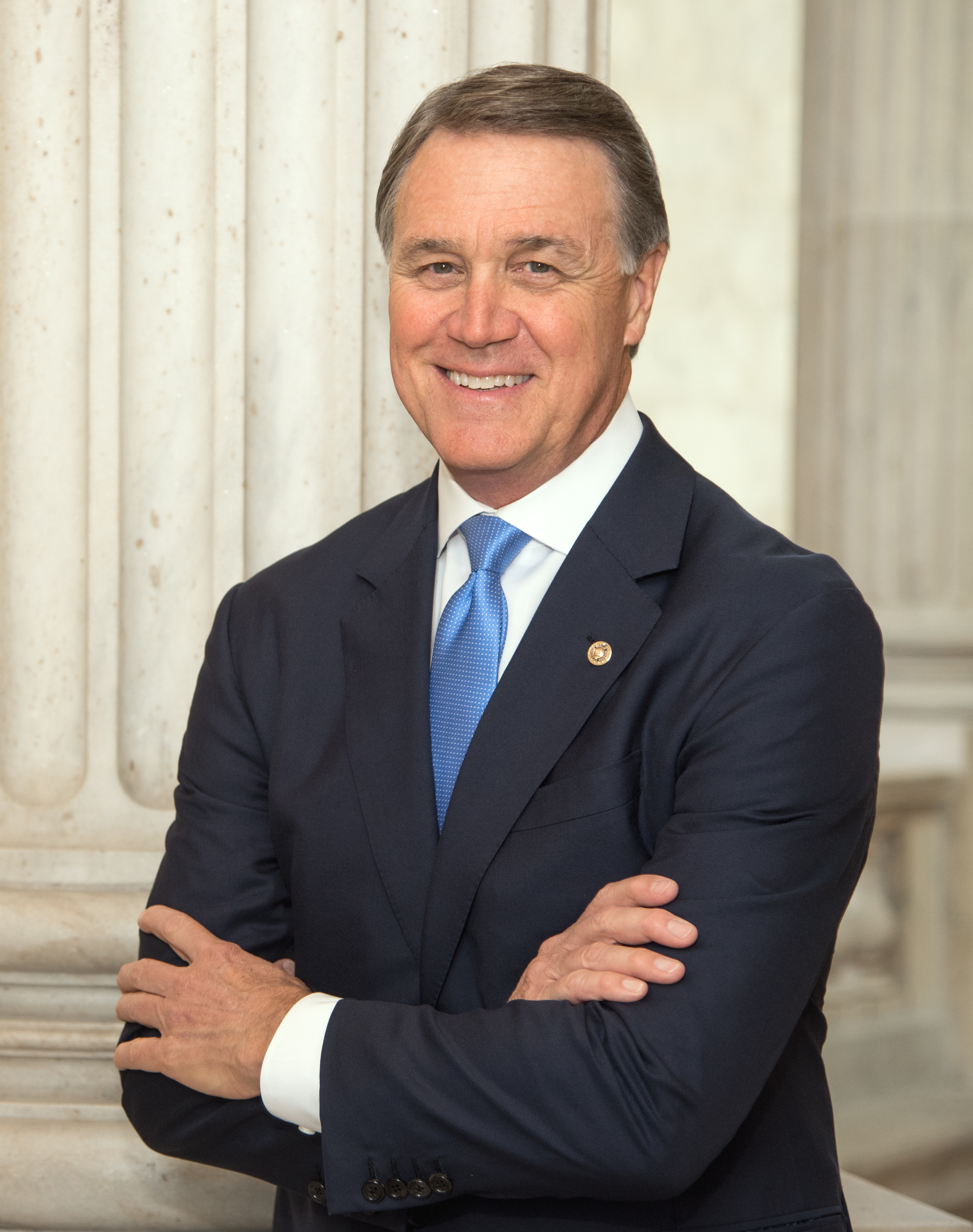
Perdue during the 114th United States Congress

An ad from Perdue's campaign with his opponent, Jon Ossoff's (right), nose controversially enlarged

Perdue ran for reelection to the U.S. Senate in the 2020 election. During the campaign, he repeatedly made false claims that his Democratic opponent, Jon Ossoff, is "endorsed" by the Communist Party of the United States. Perdue also ran an ad in which Ossoff's nose was enlarged; the apparent use of an anti-Semitic trope was criticized as a dog-whistle reference to Ossoff's Jewish heritage. The ad featured Ossoff's image next to that of Senate Democratic leader Chuck Schumer, who is also Jewish, and said Democrats are trying to "buy Georgia," with a link to raise funds for Perdue's campaign. His campaign pulled the ad after receiving criticism, saying it was an "inadvertent error" and that his design firm had applied a filter that distorted the image.

In October 2020, Perdue mocked Democratic vice presidential nominee Kamala Harris by repeatedly mispronouncing her name during a campaign event. Perdue called Harris "Kah-mah-la or Kah-ma-la or Kamamboamamla". Some commentators noted that Perdue, who had been serving with Harris in the Senate since 2017, undoubtedly knows how to pronounce her name, and some said he deliberately pretended otherwise to appeal to a largely white audience. A spokesman for Perdue responded to the criticism, saying "Senator Perdue simply mispronounced Senator Harris's name, and he didn't mean anything by it."

During an October 28 debate, Ossoff accused Perdue of "downplaying the threat of the coronavirus pandemic" while simultaneously "buying stocks in health care companies and selling shares in travel-related industries". The Hill noted that video of the exchange was viewed nearly 10 million times in the following day. Perdue boycotted the final debate against Ossoff.

No candidate received more than 50% of the vote in the November 3 election, resulting in a January 2021 runoff between Perdue and Ossoff. After failing to get more than 50% of the vote in the November election, Perdue claimed without evidence that there had been "failures" in the election, and called for Georgia secretary of state Brad Raffensperger's resignation. Raffensperger is a Republican for whom Perdue campaigned in the 2018 Georgia secretary of state race. In December 2020, Perdue supported a lawsuit by Trump allies seeking to overturn the election results. On December 6, Perdue was absent from the Georgia Senate runoff debate against Ossoff, leaving Ossoff to debate an empty podium. In January 2021, after an audio recording captured Trump pressuring Raffensperger to overturn Georgia's presidential election results and "find" enough votes for him to win, Perdue responded by criticizing Raffensperger for recording the conversation, while Perdue downplayed the significance of Trump pressuring Raffensperger.

On November 13, Perdue attended a packed campaign event in Cumming, Georgia, alongside senators Rick Scott and Kelly Loeffler, both of whom later tested positive for COVID-19. On November 20, Perdue and Loeffler held a campaign event with Vice President Mike Pence in Canton, Georgia.

As of the start of December 2020, outside groups had spent $84.2 million supporting Perdue in the election, compared to $44.4 million supporting Ossoff. On December 31, Perdue and his wife announced they were quarantining after being exposed to the virus. Both tested negative the day before, and they said they were unsure how long the quarantine would last. On January 1, 2021, Perdue absented himself from the override of Trump's veto of the defense spending bill.

Perdue's term expired on January 3, 2021, leaving the seat vacant pending the runoff's outcome. On January 5, Perdue lost the runoff and Ossoff was declared the winner. Perdue initially seemed reluctant to accept the outcome with his campaign sending out a message saying that once every legal vote was counted Perdue would win. However, Perdue did later acknowledge his defeat and concede to Ossoff, two days after the election.

In February 2021, Perdue filed paperwork to run against incumbent Democrat Raphael Warnock in the 2022 election. However, a few days later, he declined to enter the race.

== 2022 Georgia gubernatorial election ==
Recruited and endorsed by former president Donald Trump, Perdue officially announced his challenge against Brian Kemp in the 2022 Georgia gubernatorial election Republican primary on December 6, 2021. That same month, Perdue said he would not have certified the 2020 elections if he had been governor at the time, and he filed a lawsuit that recycled false claims of fraud about the 2020 election. He also pledged to create a new separate police unit for investigating electoral fraud and electoral crimes and to abolish the state income tax. He faced criticism from Governor Kemp around his prior history of outsourcing jobs in the companies he has run. Perdue lost the May 24 primary election to incumbent governor Kemp in a landslide, being defeated 74% to 22%.

== Ambassador to China (2025–present) ==
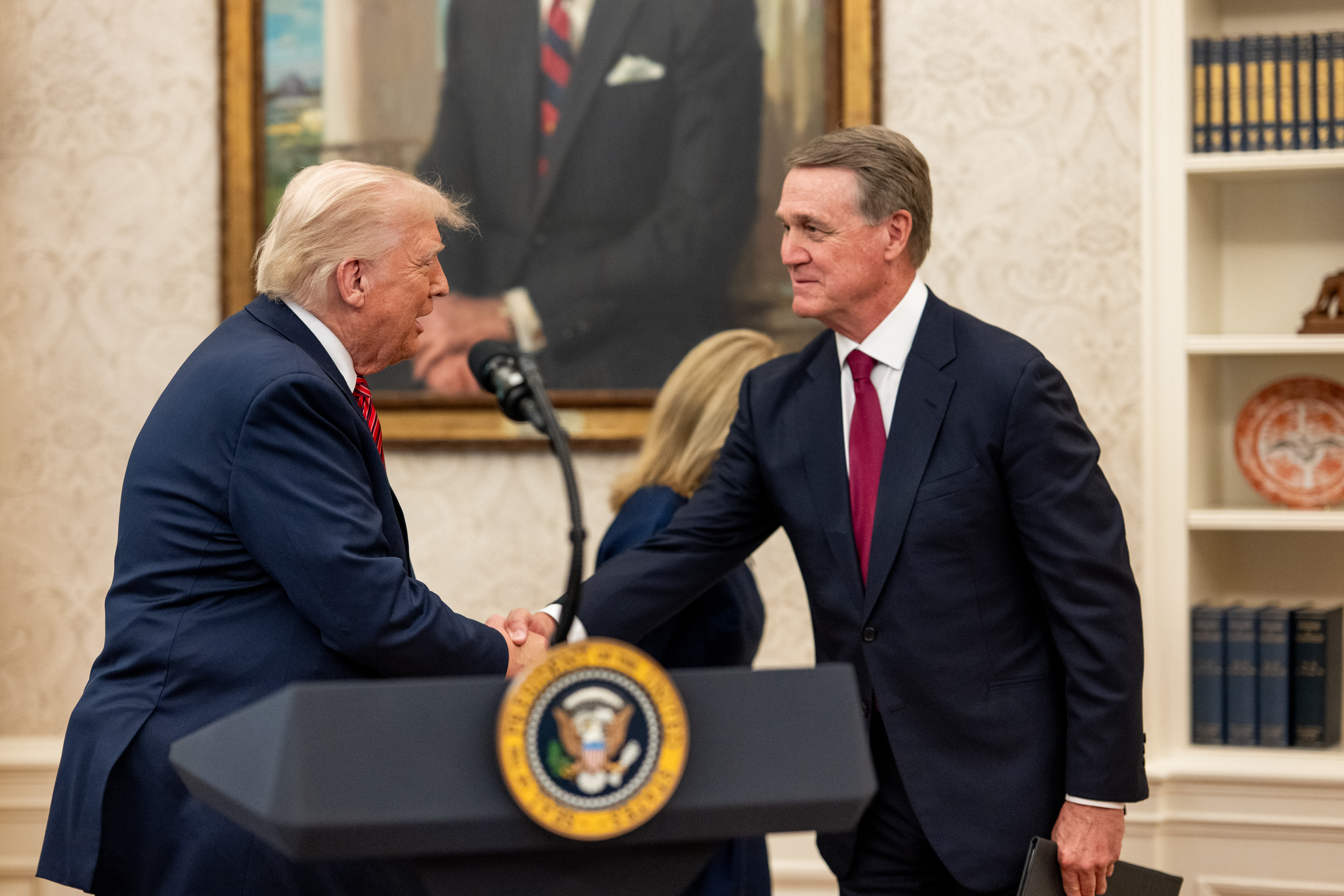
President Donald Trump shakes hands with Perdue after swearing him in as US ambassador to China (2025)

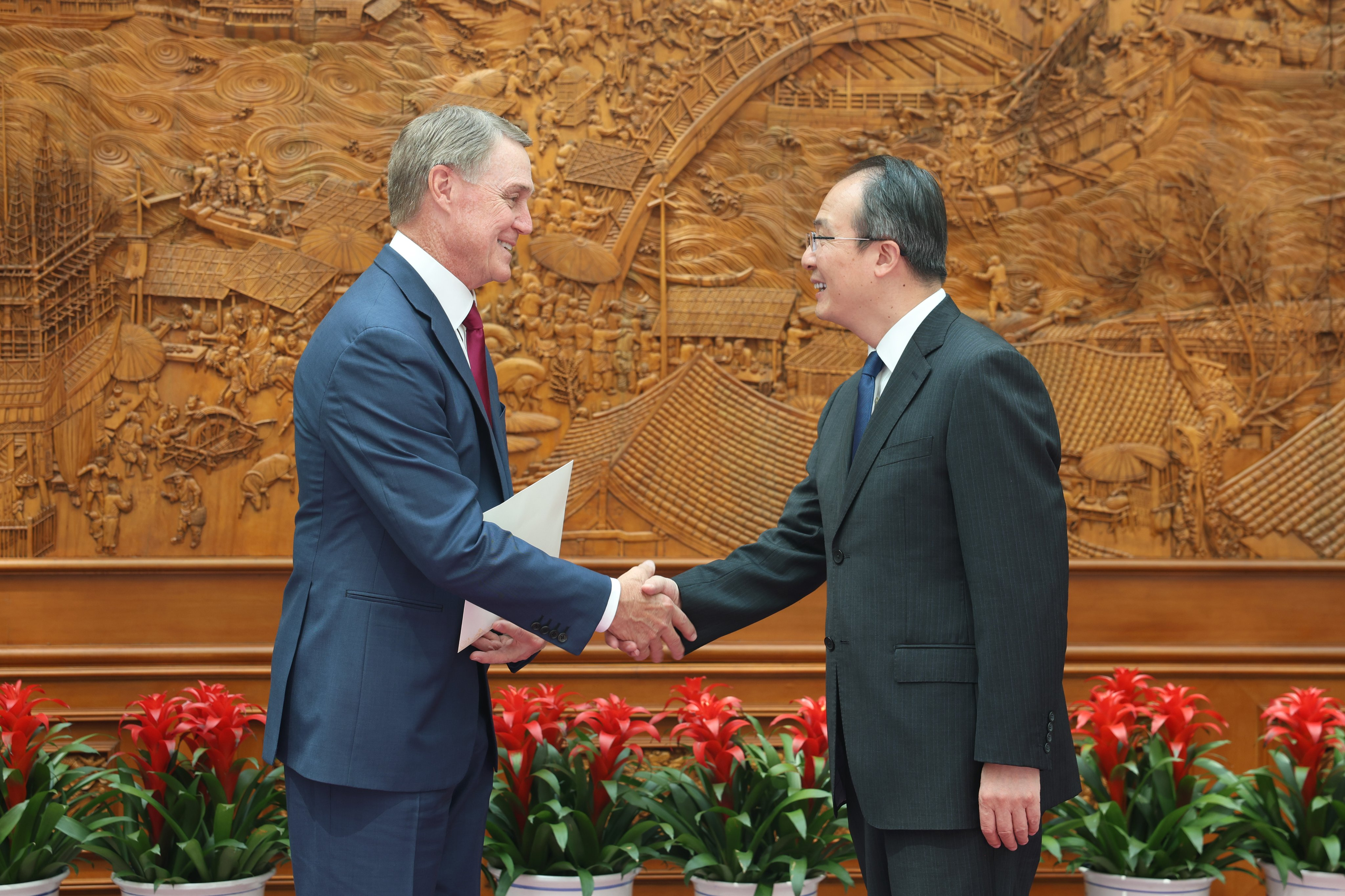
Perdue with China's Assistant Minister of Foreign Affairs Hong Lei, May 2025

US Ambassador to China David Perdue presents his credentials to General Secretary of the Chinese Communist Party Xi Jinping

On December 5, 2024, President-elect Donald Trump announced Perdue as his nominee for United States ambassador to China in the second Trump administration. Perdue's confirmation hearing was held at the United States Senate Committee on Foreign Relations on April 3, 2025.

During his confirmation hearing, Perdue stated the "two countries will naturally have areas of disagreement" and "we should seek areas where our interests align to develop a better and safer working relationship." On April 29, 2025, the United States Senate confirmed him with a vote of 67 to 29.

On May 7, 2025, Perdue was sworn in as an ambassador by President Donald Trump at a ceremony held in the Oval Office. On May 15, 2025, Perdue arrived in China to take up his position and on the following day, he presented his credentials to the director-general of the Protocol Department of the Ministry of Foreign Affairs of China Hong Lei.

== Political positions ==
=== Environment and climate change ===
Perdue rejects the scientific consensus on climate change. He had criticized the Environmental Protection Agency (EPA) and supported Trump's appointment of Scott Pruitt as EPA administrator, saying in 2017, "Outside of eliminating the EPA altogether, Scott Pruitt is the next best thing." Perdue was one of 22 Republican senators to sign a letter to Trump urging him to withdraw the U.S. from the Paris Agreement. As of 2020, Perdue lives in a private beachfront community that is building sea walls to combat sea level rise, a known effect of climate change.

=== President Donald Trump ===
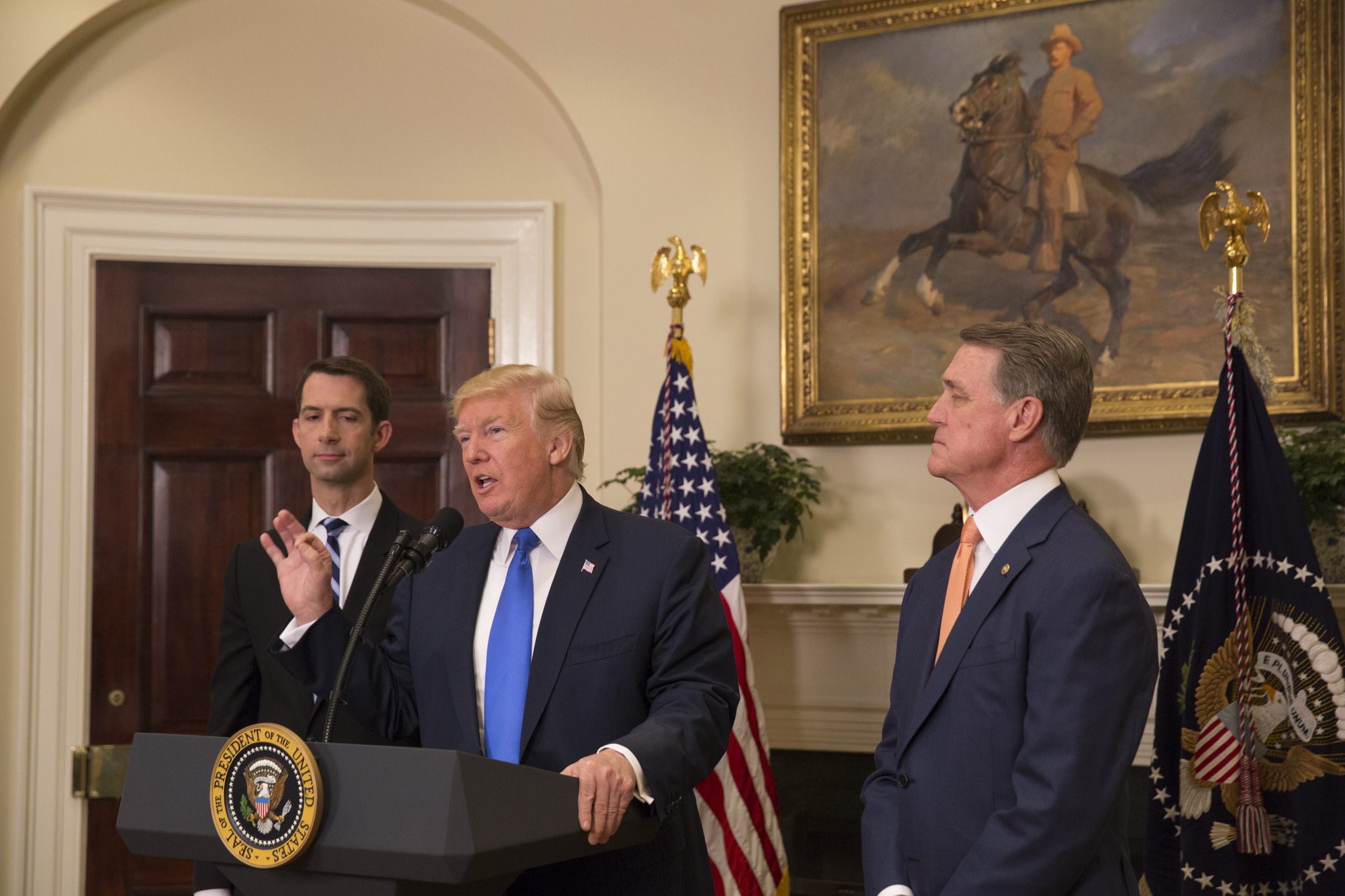
Perdue (right) with Republican Senator Tom Cotton and President Donald Trump.

Perdue was a close ally of President Trump during his tenure in the Senate. Some of Perdue's only public criticism of Trump centered on tariffs. Perdue was initially reluctant to support Trump's proposed tariffs on foreign steel and aluminum, but came to support them.

On January 11, 2018, Perdue attended a meeting at the White House at which, according to some participants, Trump purportedly referred to Haiti, El Salvador and African countries as "shithole nations" and remarked the United States should not take additional immigrants from them. Perdue said he did not recall Trump making those statements. Perdue subsequently elaborated that Trump "did not use that word", and that the accusation was "a gross misrepresentation". Off the record White House officials told the Washington Post that Perdue privately expressed belief that Trump had said "shithouse", not "shithole". On January 1, 2021, Perdue absented himself from the override of Trump's veto of the defense spending bill.

=== Economy ===
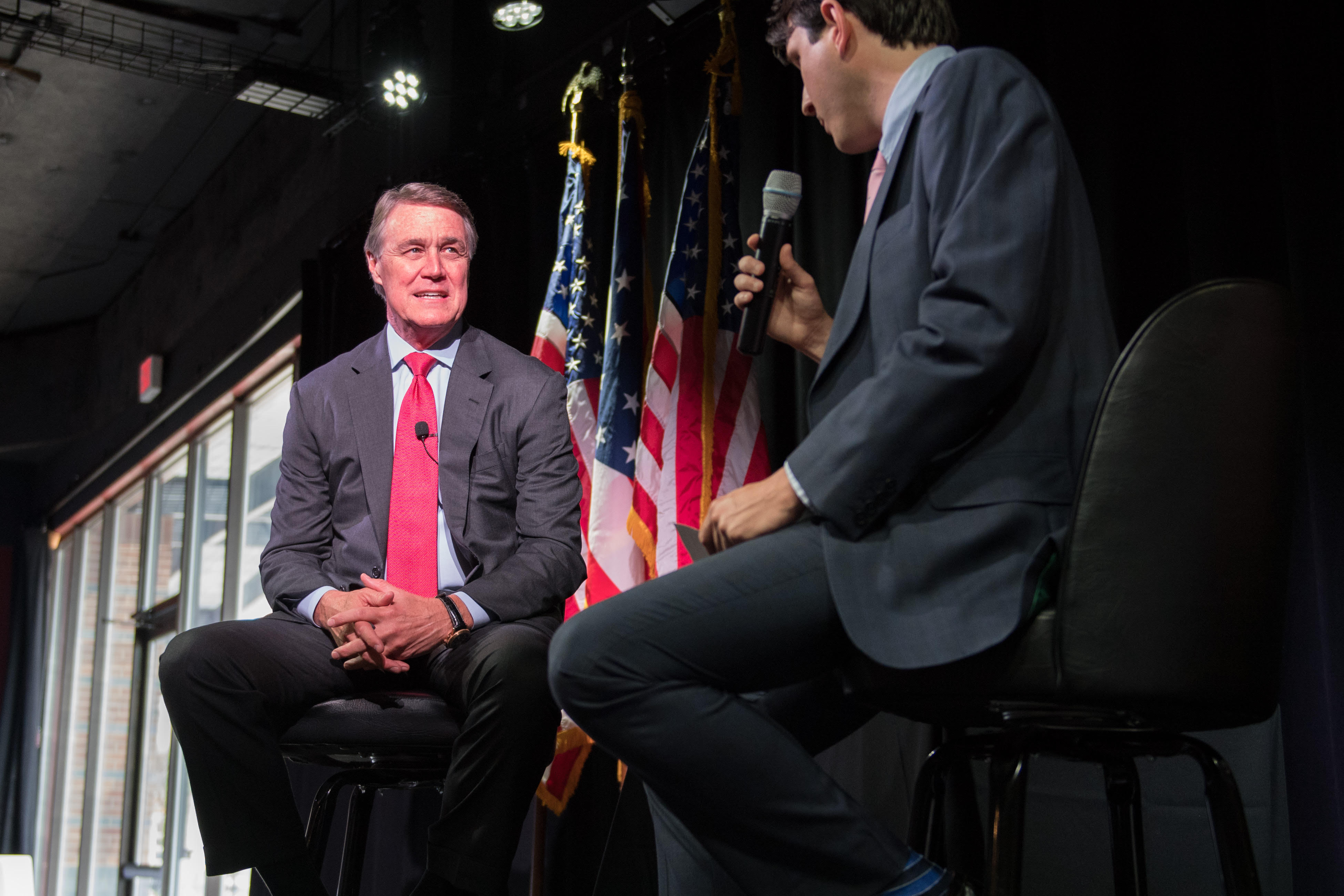
Perdue at the 2016 Republican National Convention

In December 2017, Perdue voted for the Tax Cuts and Jobs Act. He voted for the 2017 budget, which could add as much as $1.5 trillion to deficits over ten years, because he said the tax cuts could lead to more revenue due to the economic growth they would encourage.

Perdue supports a constitutional balanced budget amendment.

In September 2018, Perdue was one of six Republican senators (along with Jeff Flake, Mike Lee, Rand Paul, Ben Sasse, and Pat Toomey), as well as Bernie Sanders, who voted against a $854 billion spending bill for the Defense, Health and Human Services, Labor, and Education departments, meant to avoid a government shutdown.

Perdue opposed a proposed Rivian electric vehicle factory near Atlanta, criticizing the company during the 2022 primaries as a "George Soros-owned woke corporation" that is "seemingly inconsistent with Georgia values" (citing COVID-19 vaccine mandates, and diversity and inclusion policies), and a package of $1.5 billion in taxpayer incentives he claimed were the "worst deal" he had ever seen.

=== Foreign policy ===
In March 2017, Perdue co-sponsored the Israel Anti-Boycott Act, a bill that would make it a federal crime for Americans to encourage or participate in boycotts against Israel and Israeli settlements in the occupied Palestinian territories if protesting actions by the Israeli government.

In April 2018, Perdue signed a letter asking the Trump administration to respond to revelations that North Korea was supplying some components of chemical weapons in Syria.

In November 2019, at the White House's request, Perdue blocked a vote on recognizing the Armenian genocide.

In January 2020, Perdue expressed support for the US military's assassination of Iranian major general Qasem Soleimani by drone strike at the Baghdad International Airport.

=== Health care ===
Perdue opposed the Affordable Care Act (Obamacare) and voted to repeal it. In 2017, he supported replacing Obamacare with the American Health Care Act. The Congressional Budget Office projected that 22 million fewer Americans would be insured by 2026 with this bill than if Obamacare remained. The Urban Institute projected that the Better Care Reconciliation Act would have resulted in 376,000 more Georgians lacking health insurance. Ultimately, no measure to replace Obamacare in 2017 succeeded.

During his 2020 reelection campaign, Perdue said he "always believed in protections for Americans with preexisting conditions", and that "health insurance should always cover preexisting conditions. For anyone." PolitiFact rated this claim "false", noting Perdue's opposition to Obamacare and support of policies that would allow insurers not to cover all preexisting conditions. Perdue co-sponsored the PROTECT Act (which was not voted on in the Senate), which would have allowed insurers to refuse coverage if they "will not have the capacity to deliver services adequately." In 2018, Perdue also supported longer extensions for short-term health insurance plans, which can exclude coverage for preexisting conditions. A spokesperson for Perdue said that PolitiFact "cherry-picked select information to draw a misleading conclusion".

=== Immigration ===
In 2017, Perdue and Tom Cotton co-sponsored the RAISE Act, an immigration reductionist proposal that would cut legal immigration to the United States by 50% over 10 years, restrict the family reunification part of the Immigration and Nationality Act of 1965, eliminate the diversity visa lottery, and create a points-based immigration system that would favor skilled immigrants.

In June 2019, Perdue supported Trump's decision to place tariffs on Mexico unless illegal immigration from Mexico stopped. Perdue said, "He has to use a hammer. We're being invaded right now."

=== Education ===
Perdue opposed the Common Core plan, which Georgia Republican leaders adopted in 2010, and then turned against. Perdue said he supported "the original intent" of Common Core but took issue with "the details" and "how it's going to be administered," saying "Common Core has become overreaching and should be abandoned."

=== Same-sex marriage ===
Perdue opposed same-sex marriage. After the U.S. Supreme Court ruled it constitutional in 2015, he co-sponsored a bill that would allow federal contractors and employees to oppose same-sex marriage on the grounds of moral or religious convictions.

== Personal life ==
Perdue married Bonnie Dunn in August 1972. The couple lives in Sea Island, Georgia. They had a daughter who died in infancy and two sons, David A. Perdue III and Blake Perdue, as well as three grandchildren.

== Electoral history ==
=== 2014 Senate election ===
United States Senate Republican primary election in Georgia, 2014
Party	Candidate	Votes	%
Republican	David Perdue	185,466	30.64%
Republican	Jack Kingston	156,157	25.80%
Republican	Karen Handel	132,944	21.96%
Republican	Phil Gingrey	60,735	10.03%
Republican	Paul Broun	58,297	9.63%
Republican	Derrick Grayson	6,045	1.00%
Republican	Arthur "Art" Gardner	5,711	0.94%
Total votes		605,355	100%

United States Senate Republican primary runoff election in Georgia, 2014
Party	Candidate	Votes	%
Republican	David Perdue	245,951	50.88%
Republican	Jack Kingston	237,448	49.12%
Total votes		483,399	100.00%

United States Senate general election in Georgia, 2014
Party	Candidate	Votes	%	±%
Republican	David Perdue	1,358,088	52.89%	−
Democratic	Michelle Nunn	1,160,811	45.21%	−
Libertarian	Amanda Swafford	48,862	1.90%	−
Write-in	Anantha Reddy Muscu	21	0.00%	−
Write-in	Mary Schroder	14	0.00%	−
Write-in	Brian Russell Brown	9	0.00%	−
Total votes		2,567,805	100.0	
Republican hold				

=== 2020 Senate election ===
United States Senate Republican primary election in Georgia, 2020
Party	Candidate	Votes	%
Republican	David Perdue (incumbent)	992,555	100%
Total votes		992,555	100%

United States Senate general election in Georgia, 2020
Party	Candidate	Votes	%	±%
Republican	David Perdue (incumbent)	2,462,617	49.73%	−3.16%
Democratic	Jon Ossoff	2,374,519	47.95%	+2.74%
Libertarian	Shane T. Hazel	115,039	2.32%	+0.42%
Write-in		952	0.02%	n/a
Total votes		4,953,127	100.0	

United States Senate runoff election in Georgia, 2021
Party	Candidate	Votes	%	±%
Democratic	Jon Ossoff	2,269,923	50.61%	
Republican	David Perdue (incumbent)	2,214,979	49.39%	
Total votes		4,484,902	100.0%	
Democratic gain from Republican				

=== 2022 Georgia gubernatorial election ===
Georgia Gubernatorial Republican primary, 2022
Party	Candidate	Votes	%
Republican	Brian Kemp (incumbent)	887,389	73.7
Republican	David Perdue	262,118	21.8
Republican	Kandiss Taylor	41,183	3.4
Republican	Catherine Davis	9,775	0.8
Republican	Tom Williams	3,252	0.3

Business positions
Preceded by Cal Turner Jr.	CEO of Dollar General; 2003–2007	Succeeded by Richard Dreiling
Party political offices
Preceded by Saxby Chambliss	Republican nominee for U.S. Senator from Georgia (Class 2); 2014, 2020	Succeeded by Mike Collins
U.S. Senate
Preceded by Saxby Chambliss	U.S. Senator (Class 2) from Georgia; 2015–2021; Served alongside: Johnny Isakson, Kelly Loeffler	Succeeded by Jon Ossoff
Diplomatic posts
Preceded by R. Nicholas Burns	United States Ambassador to China; 2025–present	Incumbent
U.S. order of precedence (ceremonial)
Preceded by Wyche Fowler as Former U.S. senator	Order of precedence of the United States	Succeeded by John E. Sununu as Former U.S. senator
Preceded by Kamala Harris as Former Vice President	Order of precedence of the United States; At Post (within China)	Succeeded by Marco Rubio as Secretary of State
