= 2019–2020 United States flu season =

2019–2020 influenza outbreak

The Centers for Disease Control and Prevention (CDC) estimates that, as of April 4, 2020, the 2019–2020 United States flu season had caused 39 million to 56 million flu illnesses, 410,000 to 740,000 hospitalizations and 24,000 to 62,000 deaths. In January 2020, the Director of the National Institute of Allergies and Infectious Diseases, Dr. Anthony Fauci expected the 2019–2020 flu season to be one of the worst in several years, at least as severe as the 2017–2018 season. By the third week in February the seasonal flu was near its peak with over 26 million people sickened, 250,000 hospitalized, and 14,000 who died. Experts said that the flu came in two waves, with a hard impact on children. The season began in October, earlier than usual, with the expected wave of influenza B virus. The number of children who died, 105, was higher in late February than any season for the past ten years with about 67% associated with influenza B viruses. The second wave came with the influx of influenza A viruses, such as H1N1. According to preliminary burden estimates for the 2019–2020 flu season (October 1, 2019 through April 4, 2020) there were between 39 and 56 million flu cases; 18–26 million doctor visits; 410,000 to 740,000 hospitalizations, and between 24,000 and 62,000 deaths. The unusually abrupt decline in cases by April 2020 was attributed to the effects of widespread social distancing and lockdowns aimed at COVID-19, shortening the influenza season by 5–6 weeks.

== Vaccination ==
From survey data CDC estimated that 51.8% of persons six months and older were vaccinated during the 2019–20 flu season, an increase of 2.6 percentage points from the prior season. FDA's Vaccines and Related Biological Products Advisory Committee selected the following strains for the vaccine:

- an A/Brisbane/02/2018 (H1N1)pdm09-like virus
- an A/Kansas/14/2017 (H3N2)-like virus
- a B/Colorado/06/2017-like virus (B/Victoria lineage)

CDC end of season influenza vaccine effectiveness study for all vaccine types showed the vaccines were 39%,30%, and 45% effective against influenza A or B viruses, A(H1N1)pdm09 viruses, and influenza B/Victoria viruses, respectively.

== See also ==
- United States influenza statistics by flu season
