= 1789–1790 influenza epidemic =

- Disease: Influenza
- Location: North America
- First reported: Southern United States
- Arrival date: September 1789
- Date: 1789–1790

Between the fall of 1789 and the spring of 1790, influenza occurred extensively throughout the United States and North America more broadly. First reported in the southern United States in September, it spread throughout the northern states in October and November, appeared about the same time in the West Indies, and reached as far north as Nova Scotia before the end of 1789. In the spring of 1790, a renewed epidemic developed, almost as universal as the first but more often fatal.

== History ==
=== Background ===
By the late 18th century, influenza was a relatively common feature in North America. The disease was recorded on the continent for the first time in 1647. The Western Hemisphere was then involved in several pandemics during the 1700s, including one in 1761 which, notably, might have begun in North America. Before 1789, the last major influenza epidemic on the continent was in the spring of 1781.

In March 1788, influenza broke out in Saint Petersburg and in Kherson (at the time part of Russia), as well as in Warsaw, where even the King of Poland was afflicted. It then spread westward across Europe throughout the year, evidently appearing last in Geneva, in October.

Following this epidemic of 1788, influenza was generally not reported again until the latter half of 1789, though there is perhaps some evidence that the disease may have been present in some form during the intervening period. For example, Luigi Careno, an Italian doctor based in Vienna, details a "very epidemic catarrh" (Note: "Catarrhus epidemicus", or epidemic catarrh, was another name for influenza at this time.) that prevailed in the city during the winter of 1789; William Eden, then Ambassador to Spain for George III, describes "a new influenza of colds" prevailing in March 1789 in Madrid, where his ambassadorship was at that time coming to an end; and, according to the College of Physicians of Philadelphia, influenza was epidemic in that city in April 1789. Beyond these accounts, however, the major histories of the disease on the whole make no mention of influenza during this time.

The connection between the epidemic of 1788 and that of 1789–1790, if any, is not entirely clear. Historically, the two were often considered separately, though some authors have considered them together as a single epidemic period, both in older and more modern sources.

=== First epidemic ===
According to Noah Webster, some accounts place the earliest outbreaks of the disease in Canada, though there is very little, if any, evidence of this, beyond Webster's reporting. Influenza was present in Georgia in September, and at least one report suggests that it was also prevalent in South Carolina (Charleston) by the end of the month and soon after. It appeared in Virginia at the end of September.

The flu broke out sometime in September in New York City, then the capital of the young nation, where it quickly assumed epidemic proportions. John Fenno, publisher of the influential Gazette of the United States, contracted the disease in early October. On the 9th, he wrote of "an almost universal Complaint here of a severe Cold"; the next day, he came to the conclusion that the city was "afflicted with the Influenza—I can call it by no other name." In a letter to his sister, dated 12 October, George Washington describes "[a] sort of epidemical cold" that had pervaded the city but which he had thus far been able to avoid. This "Epidemick cold", as Abigail Adams called it, soon invaded the household of Richmond Hill, on Manhattan Island, afflicting the whole Adams family (except for John Quincy and the vice president, who had departed for Braintree (now Quincy), Massachusetts, on the 5th and the 12th, respectively). On 15 October, the president set out on his tour of the New England states.

Philadelphia was stricken at the beginning of October, or perhaps even as early as late September; the outbreak there, in any case, developed subsequently to the one in New York. William Currie, a notable physician in the city, speculated that the disease could have been brought, at least in part, by some Friends of Philadelphia Yearly Meeting that had come from New York for the body's annual meeting, which that year was held from 28 September to 3 October. On the other hand, Benjamin Rush, another eminent doctor of Philadelphia, suggested that members of the 1st Congress, arriving in the city from New York after the close of the first session on 29 September, might have played a part in introducing the disease. They were, perhaps not surprisingly, "much indisposed with colds", and though they attributed their general sickness "to... fatigue and the night air", the immense and rapid spread of the disease shortly thereafter made it clear that it must have been the one "so well known of late years, by the name of the Influenza."

To observers such as Rush, the disease was considered to have spread from these cities "in all directions". It was general in Fairfield County, Connecticut, at the beginning of October. On the 12th or 15th, it broke out in Hartford, where Webster lived at that time. On the 19th, he left the town for Boston and arrived there the next day. By the last week of October, the disease was prevalent in the interior of Pennsylvania, as well as in New Jersey, Delaware, and Maryland; by the first week of November, it was prevalent in all the states of New England (Connecticut, Rhode Island, Massachusetts, and New Hampshire).

On 24 October, Washington arrived in Boston, escorted by Lieutenant Governor Samuel Adams and the Executive Council, amid much fanfare. A massive crowd had gathered in a procession to welcome him. According to Webster, who began to develop symptoms the day of his own arrival in the city, influenza was not yet present among the inhabitants at this time. Nonetheless, by the 26th, Washington had contracted it, and soon thereafter it broke out more noticeably throughout the city. This timing was not lost on the people, who quickly took to calling the prevailing ailment by such names as the "Washington influenza", the "Washington cold", and the "President's cough", suspecting they had caught it during the celebrations. By the start of November, the city of Boston was "universally seized" by the flu, such that, according to at least one report, nine-tenths of its inhabitants had already fallen ill.

Influenza began to appear in the West Indies around the same time as it did in the northern United States, in October and November. It broke out in Westmoreland Parish, Jamaica, around 20 October and in Nassau, on the island of New Providence, in the last week of October. The disease "raged universally" on the islands of Sint Eustatius, Saint Kitts, and Dominica at this time as well.

In early November, some trade vessels arrived at the ports of St. George's and Grenville Bay in Grenada from these afflicted islands. These ships, it was believed, introduced the flu into the island, as they were navigated by enslaved sailors who were "very much afflicted with it". These sailors, returning to the homes of their respective enslavers, were lodged alongside others of their station, who at that time were "in a perfect state of health". In less than a week, however, all were stricken; and, over the course of a fortnight, influenza became universally prevalent in St. George's. This same month, it was similarly universal in Saint Croix and in Kingston.

In these parts, similar to on the mainland, great numbers were afflicted, but the illness was mostly not very fatal. In Kingston, it struck "all classes of people, and few escaped it"; generally mild, it occasioned few or no fatalities. Similarly, in St. George's, it "indiscriminately" infected both whites and blacks, with "very few" escaping it; and, in Westmoreland Parish, it "seized great numbers of all ages, colours, and sexes", even among the young and healthy. Nonetheless, it did still have the potential to be severe during this initial epidemic. In the parish, the disease indeed "visited successively, less or more, every estate and settlement", but it could vary from place to place: Some were affected very severely, while others experienced milder outbreaks, even a few hardly perceiving its presence at all.

The epidemic continued to rage throughout the United States in November, by which time the whole country was in its grip. As The Vermont Gazette reported for 9 November, "So universal a complaint of bad colds perhaps never prevailed in America before, as at present." Its publishers, in the same report, express their apologies for the abbreviated edition that day, as the flu had afflicted their own families, as it had so many already. In Boston, where the disease "rag'd universally", felling entire families, normal business faltered in the middle of the month on account of the outbreak; bread production, for example, declined to less than a quarter of its typical output.

On 1 November, John Adams wrote to his wife Abigail from Braintree that "[t]he Influenza is here as general as it was at N. York", informing her that their youngest son, Thomas, had come down with it there but was improving. Abigail would later receive word from her sister, Mary Smith Cranch (with whom Thomas was staying at this time), that the whole household was "much indisposed with colds but nobody quite sick". On the 22nd, Abigail wrote to her eldest son, John Quincy, admonishing him for not writing at all after leaving New York the month before. As it turned out, John had contracted "a severe cold" upon his arrival in Braintree on 9 October, which confined him for 2 or 3 days; only later did he conclude that it had likely been the influenza. Writing to his mother on 5 December, he describes the sickness as "almost universal in this State", as it had been since his own infection. He recounts having been scolded for singularly maintaining relatively good health during this time, "while all the world were more or less diseased".

In December, the flu prevailed in Nova Scotia and, near the end of the month, appeared in Saint Lucia. It appeared among the Spanish settlements in South America that winter. In the United States, it persisted into December. The epidemic in Philadelphia lasted about six or seven weeks. On the whole, it took six to eight weeks for the disease to spread across the whole country.

The epidemic reportedly afflicted Native Americans with some severity. According to the land surveyor Andrew Ellicott, influenza struck those in the Niagara region "with peculiar force"; they apparently considered the attendant cough of the illness to be "so new and so irritating" that they attributed it to "witchcraft".

=== Second epidemic ===
In Grenada, a shift in the presentation of the disease began to be observed in the middle of December. While earlier in the fall it had been a more catarrhal (i.e., coldlike) affliction, it soon took on a more inflammatory character, marked "by the violence, obscurity, and insidious nature of its symptoms" when it first appeared on some estates. This change "increased to a most alarming degree, and rendered the disorder... extremely dangerous and fatal." By mid-January 1790, the disease was ubiquitous on the island again.

A similar shift was noted around this time in Virginia, where over the winter an inflammatory ailment began to appear, associated with symptoms so much more severe that there was some uncertainty whether it was influenza at all. The disease "was much more fatal" and often resistant to treatment. In the north, influenza evidently reappeared first along the Hudson River the last week of March, in Albany and in Vermont, where it laid entire families low for weeks. In early April it appeared along the Connecticut River, to the east, and from there in the northeast apparently spread in a southwest direction.

By 5 April, the incidence of "bad colds and inflammatory disorders" was reportedly already greater than it had ever been in southern Vermont. Indeed, it was quite clear by mid-April that the influenza had returned to the United States. It was once again "universal" in Hartford; it was "raging" in Norwich, where it was noted to have assumed "redoubled violence"; and in Boston, it had reportedly already stricken one-third of its citizens. By the end of the month, it was prevalent in Providence.

On 22 April, Sarah Livingston Jay received word of the outbreak in Hartford and, the next day, wrote to her husband John, at that time the Chief Justice of the Supreme Court, urging him to be careful while in the town, where he was at that time as part of his duties as Circuit Justice for the Eastern Circuit. Although he would not receive this message until the following month, he would have needed no warning: On 26 April, the Chief Justice wrote in his diary that "almost every Family here is down with the Influenza— some old people have died with it". Indeed, by the end of the month, "little business" was getting done at all on account of the outbreak besides tending to the sick.

Influenza reappeared in New York City sometime in April as well. Alexander Hamilton, the Secretary of the Treasury, contracted the disease there at some point, such that, by 6 May, he had been confined by the illness for "several Weeks". Late in April, influenza again invaded the estate of Richmond Hill, which Abigail Adams described as "a mere Hospital", each member confined to a different chamber with some sort of affliction; the vice president, however, again evaded infection. James Madison, then a U.S. representative from Virginia, received a "full measure" of it during this time as well.

The disease broke out in Philadelphia the last week of April, though it remained generally mild during its prevalence there over the next month, in contrast to other places. It was already declining in Boston by the first week of May but continued to spread and prevail in many parts throughout the month. It reappeared "with additional violence" in the Maryland and Virginia counties situated upon those states' "fertile rivers" and, similarly, was reported to be "mortally dangerous" in Delaware around this time.

In New Hampshire, the disease crippled normal business operations in Portsmouth, where it had broken out the month before; it prevailed in Exeter (the state's capital at this time) and neighboring towns, with some mortality reported. A report out of Newburyport, Massachusetts, near the end of May described mortality from the flu, as well as other illnesses in that area, as having surpassed that of any other time in memory.

Influenza prevailed with particular force in New York City throughout the month of May. On 8 May, Abigail Adams wrote to her sister Mary that she had recovered from what she had come to learn was the influenza, noting that "almost every Body throughout the whole city are labouring under it." Sarah Livingston Jay made a similar observation around the same time in a letter to her husband, describing the disease as "as prevalent here at present as it was last Autumn" and informing him of illnesses in the family, including that of his brother and sister-in-law. That same day, 10 May, she was seized with the influenza herself. She wrote John again a few days later, updating him of her condition, as well as that of their 1-year-old son William, who had been "likewise very ill" by then but was recovering.

The Chief Justice was in Portsmouth, on the last leg of his circuit duties, when he received his wife's letters on the 20th. He was swift to respond to the latter of the two, expressing his "anxiety" at the news of his loved ones' illnesses. He promised her that nothing would delay his return to her and stated his expectation of their reunion by mid-June, for he remained as yet well, despite the unfortunate timing of his circuit that spring: "The whole Country has been sick, and indeed is much so yet."

Indeed, in the town of Braintree, sickness was as prevalent as anywhere. In a message dated 16 May, Mary Smith Cranch wrote to her sister in New York describing the many illnesses in the family, including that of her daughter Elizabeth, whose "whole Family been sick Baby & all with this new distemper". She relates, "In short I hardly know of a Person who has not been or is now sick" — but it was not just the epidemic influenza: "I believe there have been more People who have had the measles in this Parish than ever had them before & many of them attackd with the Influenzy at the same time." Several of their acquaintances had died of the flu already. It would take until the 25th for Mary to complete her letter, sickness by then still front of mind. Having returned from Hingham, she writes that "Uncles Family every root & Branch of it were weak haveing just had the influenzy" and, similarly, that the whole family of their sister Elizabeth had been ill but were by then improved. As for her daughter Elizabeth, about whom Abigail had been much worried, and Elizabeth's young son, Mary could share the news of at least their recoveries, in contrast to so many adults and infants alike in her vicinity, whether on account of the measles or the influenza.

The epidemic continued in the nation's capital. The city was, according to Senator Richard Henry Lee of Virginia, "a perfect Hospital—few are well & many very sick." Responding to her sister in a letter dated 30 May, Abigail Adams expressed her "dread" surrounding a disconcerting piece of news that had come to public light earlier that month: The president had fallen mortally ill.

==== Washington's illness ====
It is unclear when exactly Washington contracted the influenza. The first indication of illness from the president himself was recorded in his diary, in which he wrote for Sunday, 9 May 1790, "Indisposed with a bad cold, and at home all day writing letters on private business." However, there is reason to believe that he contracted the disease as early as early April or even late March. Richard Bland Lee, a U.S. representative from Virginia, wrote to David Stuart, a doctor and close advisor to the president, on 6 April that "the President has been unwell for a few days past." Over the next several days Washington's health was apparently in decline, as attested by George Clymer, a representative from Pennsylvania, who described the "great deal of anxiety" surrounding the president's health at this time.

On 20 April, Washington set out on a tour of Long Island, apparently in an effort to regain his failing health. Several observers attest that this outing did improve his condition somewhat, but the relief was only temporary. On 7 May, William Maclay, a U.S. Senator from Pennsylvania, wrote to Benjamin Rush that the president had "nearly lost his hearing" on account of his illness. Two days later, he was afflicted with that "bad cold" and was unable to leave his bed on the 10th, on which day he "was taken with a peripneumony, of threatening appearance", according to Thomas Jefferson.

In these first days of Washington's more severe condition, an effort was made to conceal his illness from the public, "as a general allarm may have proved injurious to the present State of the government", as Abigail Adams explained to the Massachusetts physician Cotton Tufts. After a minor improvement on 12 May, the president's health declined quickly to a critical point on 15 May. By the next day, there were "no hopes of his recovery". Around this time, despite the attempts at secrecy, Washington's indisposition had become relatively well known in New York City and Philadelphia, and the press was quick to pick up on the story. There was, reportedly, "Universal Gloom throughout this Country"; in South Carolina, citizens were "greatly alarmed of late at the Account of the President's ill-health." Concern for the president emanated from across the country and even as far as Europe.

During this time, Washington was attended mainly by the eminent New York City physician Samuel Bard, who had previously tended to the president in June 1789 during another period of severe illness, which ultimately required the removal of a tumor from his left leg. While afflicted with the influenza, Washington suffered from "a very high fever" and "expectorate[d] blood". On 16 May, as his physicians considered him to be on the verge of death, he "was Seazd with Hicups & rattling in his Throat". He was administered James's fever powder, and this evidently "produced a happy Effect". That evening, he began to sweat copiously, a change that was thought to relieve his cough and improve his breathing. By the next morning, Washington was much improved, and he was considered to be out of danger. By 20 May, his fever had reportedly broken, and he was back on his feet by the 22nd. News of the president's recovery inspired universal relief, including among "friends to America" in Paris, and the press reported on this positive development.

While Washington was ill, his presidential duties were carried out by William Jackson, one of his personal secretaries. Although he had improved enough to move about his room freely by the 23rd, it seems he did not resume his official duties until the end of the month. On 3 June, Washington wrote to the Marquis de Lafayette that he was "recovered, except in point of strength". He shared the advice of his physicians to exercise more and focus less on business, but he considered it "essential to accomplish whatever I have undertaken (though reluctantly) to the best of my abilities." It was not until 24 June that he resumed making entries in his diary, around which time he added an entry for 10 May, the first day of his confinement, that described the beginning of his "severe illness ... which left me in a convalescent state for several weeks after the violence of it had passed".

In a letter to David Stuart dated 15 June, Washington reflected on the state of his health. He noted, "Within the last twelve months I have undergone more, and severer sickness than thirty preceding years afflicted me with, put it altogether", and expressed his fear that a third bout of illness might "put me to sleep with my fathers". Although thankful for how much he had improved, he could "still feel the remains of the violent affection of my lungs—The cough, the pain in my breast, and shortness in breathing not having entirely left me."

=== Aftermath ===
The epidemic in Philadelphia declined about the first week of June, and it was apparently over in most parts of the country by the summer. (Note: All references describe the second epidemic as occurring sometime in the spring of 1790.) Among the more notable victims of this epidemic was Theodorick Bland, a U.S. representative from Virginia, who succumbed to the disease on 1 June, becoming the first member of the House of Representatives to die while in office. He was succeeded by William Branch Giles, who was elected in a special election in July and took office on 7 December 1790.

The outbreak beginning in the fall of 1789 was considered to be one of the most extensive epidemics ever to affect the country by that time. Although influenza had appeared in North America in previous outbreaks, there were some who believed that this visitation was one of an entirely novel disease. It generated much attention and many theories, in particular as to whether it was contagious. Its effect on society inspired a resolution passed by the New Haven County Medical Society on 1 July, for example, that called for an investigation by "any person, whether of the faculty or not", into several key questions regarding the nature of the disease. These included:

"1st. Whether any sensible change in the air, or seasons, gave rise to the late Catarrhal Epidemic?

2d. Whether the disease was contagious?

3d. Whether a humoral pathology, is necessary to account for the origin, or first phenomena of any disease?"

The epidemiology of the disease was described in several accounts written in the years following the outbreak. Some of these include:

- "An Account of the Influenza, as It Appeared in Philadelphia, in the Autumn of 1789, in the Spring of 1790, and in the Winter of 1791", in Medical Inquiries and Observations, vol. II, by Benjamin Rush (1793)
- An inaugural dissertation on the influenza, by Robert Johnston (1793)
- An inaugural dissertation on the influenza, by Peter Irving (1794)
- A Brief History of Epidemic and Pestilential Diseases: With the Principal Phenomena of the Physical World, Which Precede and Accompany Them, and Observations Deduced from the Facts Stated, by Noah Webster (1799)

==== Recurrences ====
This epidemic came at the beginning of what has been termed a "pandemic era" (starting in 1788), in which global influenza activity remained apparently elevated for nearly 20 years (i.e., until 1806). During this time, and extending until 1889, influenza activity in the Western Hemisphere seemed disconnected from that in Europe and the rest of the Eastern Hemisphere.

After the spring of 1790, influenza recurred several times in epidemic fashion in the United States over the next few years. It returned in the fall of 1790 "with great violence in many places", such as Essex County, Virginia, and continued to prevail in the winter and spring of 1791 in places such as Philadelphia and New York. It was again "prevalent in several parts of the continent" in the fall of 1792 and throughout the northeast in the fall of 1793.

== Epidemiology ==
=== Incidence ===
The influenza was frequently noted for its universality, being perhaps more prevalent in the fall than in the spring. It struck communities suddenly, and great numbers were attacked all at once. "Few" were described as escaping it, though young children were apparently much less affected. In the eastern parts of Virginia, for example, "scarce one in a thousand escap[ed] it" in the fall; in Boston, 90 percent of the population were reportedly afflicted. It attacked both men and women and spared no particular race, though Native Americans may have been affected to a greater degree.

In the spring, it was similarly extremely prevalent. There is some evidence that those who were attacked in the fall were later spared in the spring, though apparent reinfections were not uncommon. Notably, Washington, Abigail Adams, and Noah Webster, for example, were evidently twice afflicted. Such repeat attacks sometimes occurred even within the same epidemic: Benjamin Rush describes the striking case of one woman who was stricken first in Philadelphia, again in New York, and yet again upon returning to Philadelphia.

=== Mortality ===
During its initial prevalence in the fall, the influenza was frequently noted to be mild, albeit utterly pervasive, with fatalities generally only rarely reported. In Norfolk, Virginia, for example, when it came to the few fatalities that did occur, they were attributed more to "improper management" than the severity of the illness itself. In Philadelphia, it was deadly mostly only to older people, as well as those "previously debilitated by consumptive complaints" (i.e., lung diseases, or pulmonary tuberculosis in particular); alcoholics seemed also to be a risk group.

The disease was reported as being more fatal, however, along the "sea-shore" of the country (i.e., the East Coast), as well as in the southern states. Its "ravages" in Maryland, for example, were especially apparent in Caroline County, a particularly disease-ridden area at this time. In Charleston, one of the earliest places affected, "numbers" were described as having been infected and being, by mid-October, "dangerously ill".

The second epidemic was noted early on as being of a different nature from the first and was frequently described as "fatal" and "violent" in many places, specifically in contrast to the first epidemic. New York City, for example, was severely affected. According to William Maclay, "many" in New York died every day from the disease during its prevalence in May. Abigail Adams wrote at this time that the flu had "in many places been very mortal, particularly upon long Island." In Newburyport, Massachusetts, it was reported at the end of May that "[t]he number of deaths, from influenza and other disorders in this part of the country, exceeds that of any other period now remembered." Indeed, in Boston, although most deaths occurred among the elderly, all age groups saw notable increases in mortality during the epidemic. Philadelphia, on the other hand, was apparently not much more severely affected than it had been in the fall.

== Disease ==
=== Signs and symptoms ===
Symptoms of this influenza were similar to those of typical influenza. A cough was perhaps the notable symptom, affecting almost all afflicted with the disease. A fever was also common, in addition to chills and a universal lassitude. Pain in the head and the eyeballs were also reported.

The disease during the first epidemic was described as being more "catarrhal" (i.e., coldlike) in nature, while during the second epidemic it was more "inflammatory". Pleurisy and "peripneumony" (pneumonia) were more common complications; inflammation of the heart, pericardium, and diaphragm were also observed in some victims. Uterine hemorrhages and spontaneous abortions were reported in some cases affecting pregnant women, the latter being a complication often associated with pandemic influenza.

=== Cause ===
This epidemic occurred prior to the discovery of viruses, and so the exact cause of the disease could not have been known. Theories surrounding the cause, therefore, revolved more around whether the disease was contagious or whether atmospheric conditions were to blame. Some observers, such as Rush, considered the disease contagious; indeed, Rush and Irving considered contagion to be what distinguished the influenza from catarrh or a common cold. On the other hand, Webster attributed the prevalence of the disease to "insensible qualities of the atmosphere", based in part on his own experience with it, and considered the notion of its being spread mainly by infection as "very fallacious".

In Webster's account of epidemic and pestilential diseases, he devotes considerable space to descriptions of weather conditions and other meteorological phenomena before and after epidemic periods. For 1789, he notes "an eruption of Vesuvius, just after a great earthquake at Iceland and in Europe"; a "warm summer" preceded the epidemic and a "mild winter" came after, before the 1790 epidemic.

==== El Niño ====
Richard H. Grove, of the Australian National University, Canberra, explored the potential role of the Great El Niño of the 1790s on global events, with reference to these aforementioned weather states in a 2006 study. He notes an association between this period and the incidence of influenza and concludes that "the very hot summers and mild winters which characterise El Niño conditions in much of North America appear to have encouraged the spread of epidemics in several different diseases, and not least in 1788–94." Indeed, El Niño events have been associated with the incidence of certain epidemic diseases, in particular those transmitted by mosquitoes. The relationship between the El Niño–Southern Oscillation and pandemic influenza has been explored as well, though studies have come to differing conclusions as to whether pandemics are associated with the El Niño or the La Niña phase of the cycle.

=== Treatment ===
Various "remedies" were relied upon to treat the disease. A medical student in Berkshire County, Massachusetts, describes the use of venesection, emetics, cathartics, antimonials and niter, and antiphlogistic drinks as common forms of treatment. To treat the cough, liquorice and paregoric elixir was frequently used. During convalescence, Peruvian bark was apparently "a most excellent medicine".

== See also ==
- List of notable disease outbreaks in the United States
- 1789 in the United States
- 1789 in Canada
- 1775–1782 North American smallpox epidemic
- 1793 Philadelphia yellow fever epidemic
