= Lower Mississippi Valley yellow fever epidemic of 1878 =

Disease outbreak in the United States

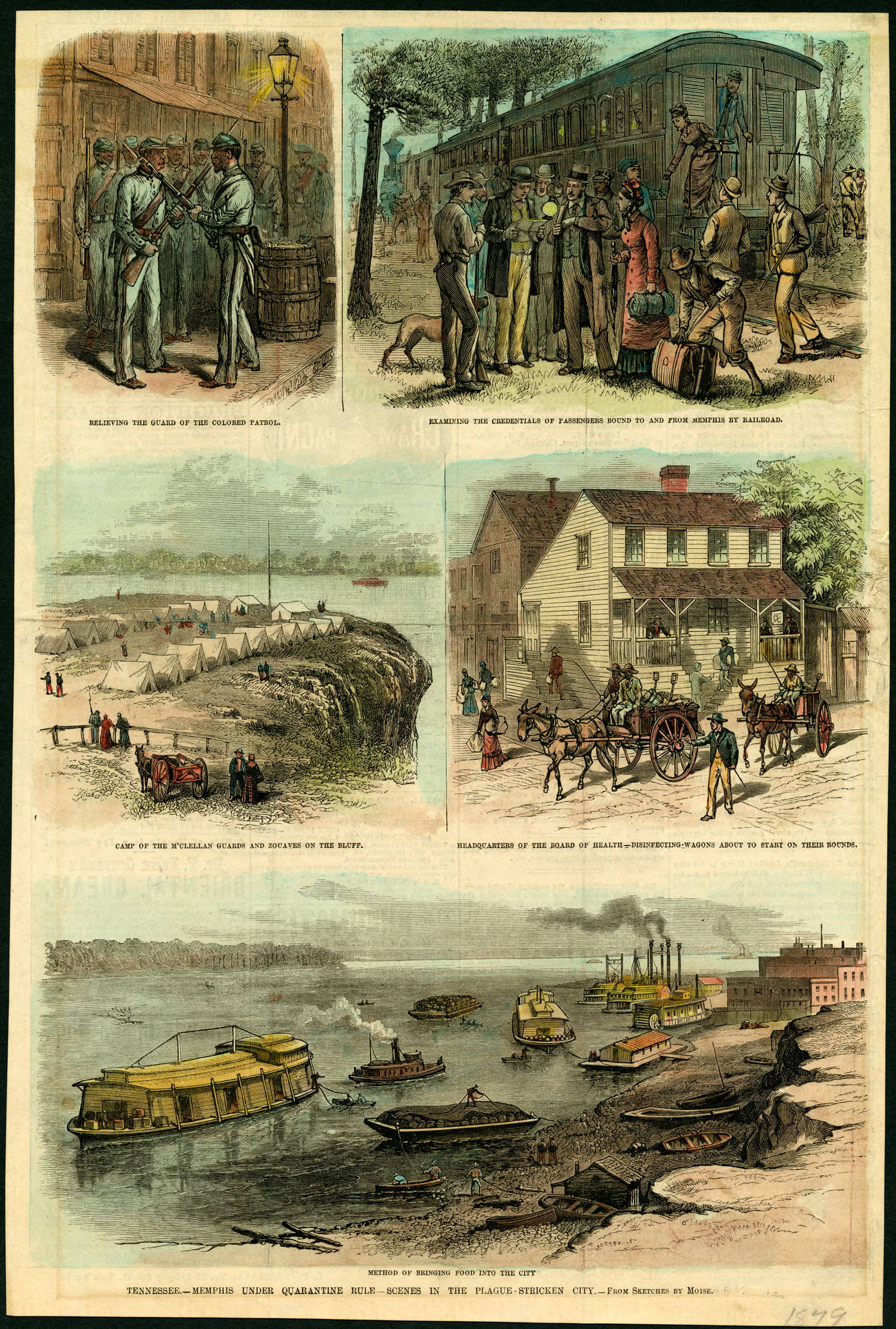
"Tennessee-Memphis under quarantine rule; scenes in the plague-stricken city" by Columbus Moise Jr.

In 1878, a severe yellow fever epidemic swept through the lower Mississippi Valley. More than 74,000 cases and nearly 16,000 deaths across Alabama, Kentucky, Louisiana, Mississippi, and Tennessee.

During the American Civil War, Union army troops in New Orleans feared that there would be an outbreak of yellow fever in the occupied city, and reacted by introducing sanitation and quarantine procedures in 1862. In 1877, the United States federal government pulled the federal troops out of New Orleans, directly causing a relaxation in the city's sanitation policies. The yellow fever outbreak had started by March 1878, and it was thought to be connected to an ongoing yellow fever outbreak in Havana. The epidemic may have spread from Cuban war refugees who were fleeing from the Ten Years' War in Cuba.

During the epidemic, tens of thousands of people fled from the stricken cities of New Orleans, Vicksburg, and Memphis. The safety policies to combat the spread of the epidemic included ordering the steamboats to be tied up in order to reduce the amount of travel along the Mississippi River, the halting of the railroad lines, and the layoff of all associated workers. This resulted in a massive rise in unemployment. It was estimated that 15,000 heads of households were unemployed within New Orleans itself, and a total of over 100,000 persons were in dire financial need.

== Events leading up to the epidemic ==
During the American Civil War, New Orleans was occupied with Union army troops, and the local populace believed that yellow fever would only kill the northern troops. These rumors instilled fear into the Union troops, and they actively practiced sanitation and quarantine procedures during their occupation in 1862 until the government pulled federal troops out of the city in 1877. The withdrawal of Union troops resulted in the relaxation of sanitation and quarantine efforts in New Orleans.

Following the yellow fever epidemic in Shreveport, Louisiana, where 769 people died between August and November 1873, the states in the Lower Mississippi Valley began to take precautions for any following epidemics. After the epidemic in Shreveport, the National Quarantine Act of 1878 was passed that allowed the United States federal government to assume control over the state in quarantines, but the law did not allow for the federal government to intercede on local medical authorities or health boards. In March of that year, a virulent strain of Yellow Fever was found in Havana, Cuba, and New Orleans health officials ordered the detainment of all vessels from the Cuban and Brazilian regions. It is unknown what exactly led to the outbreak in the Mississippi River Valley as causes ranged from unchecked vessels from the fruit trade to refugees from the Ten Years' War in Cuba, which was experiencing a rise in yellow fever cases. However, investigations at the time suggest that the epidemic originated from the steamer Emily B. Souder on May 22, 1878.

== Effects of the epidemic on the region ==
The entire Mississippi River Valley from St. Louis south was affected, and tens of thousands fled the stricken cities of New Orleans, Vicksburg, and Memphis. The epidemic in the Lower Mississippi Valley also greatly affected trade in the region, with orders of steamboats to be tied up in order to reduce the amount of travel along the Mississippi River, railroad lines were halted, and all the workers to be laid off. Carrigan states that "An estimated 15,000 heads of households were unemployed in New Orleans, 8,000 in Memphis, and several thousands more in scattered small towns – representing a total of over 100,000 persons in dire need."

=== New Orleans ===
When the epidemic broke out from the Emily B. Souder in May, roughly 40,000 residents that represent 20% of the city population fled the city, many of whom fled via the new railroads systems constructed during the Reconstruction period after the American Civil War, which further spread the virus across the Lower Mississippi Valley. The city saw roughly 20,000 total infections during the epidemic with 5,000 resulting in deaths, and saw a loss of more than $15 million due to the disruptions in trade from the epidemic. Many of the city's prominent citizens succumbed to the epidemic; among them was former Confederate General John Bell Hood and his wife.

Due to the struggles of the remaining citizens, numerous organizations formed relief committees that relied heavily on aid from the federal government in the form of relief rations and money donations from unaffected cities in the Northern United States. The federal relief came with heavy restrictions, as they were only allowed to be given to households that had yellow fever and could provide proof via a doctor's certificate or given to people considered "destitute." These restrictions led to many citizens having to go without federal aid, resulting in roughly 10,000 people receiving aid despite there being 20,000 cases of yellow fever alone.

=== Memphis ===
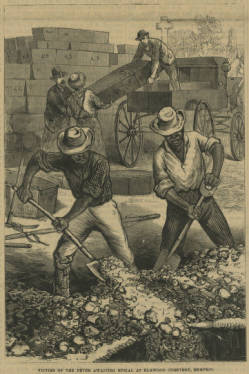
Yellow Fever Burials in Memphis at Elmwood Cemetery

Memphis suffered several epidemics during the 1870s, culminating in the 1879 epidemic following the most severe bout of the fever, the 1878 wave. During this year, there were more than 5,000 fatalities in the city. Some contemporary accounts said that commercial interests had prevented the rapid reporting of the outbreak of the epidemic, increasing the total number of deaths. People still did not understand how the disease developed or was transmitted, and did not know how to prevent it.

These misconceptions regarding the mechanism of the virus exacerbated the rising death toll in Memphis as people operated under false notions of safety in the fever-ridden zones of the city. According to J.M. Keating, renowned for his highly referenced history of the 1878 yellow fever epidemic in Memphis, his text underscores the lack of consensus among medical professionals at this time. He spends the first two chapters of his anthology explaining the conflicting theories regarding the epidemiology of the virus and makes no mention of what is now known to be the real culprit, the Aedes aegypti mosquito. Unknown to physicians at the time, yellow fever was spread through the bite of an infected mosquito which proliferated in warm, moist areas of high population density. Given its urban and largely unsanitary environment in a vital trading location on the Mississippi River, Memphis became the ideal locale for the virus to take root after spreading from its origin in New Orleans.

Similar to the preventative measures taken in New Orleans was the implementation of the quarantine in Memphis. Once the spread of the virus to Memphis became imminent, a city-wide quarantine was instated which barred entry into the city. Unknown to public officials in Memphis, the virus had already arrived to the city by the time the quarantine went into effect, making this a futile approach to reducing spread. Beyond the quarantine, other common precautions included avoiding coming in contact with the "excreta" or bodily fluids of fever victims due to the misconception that the virus could be transferred through these liquids. While the impact of the mosquito remained unnoticed, ill-prepared citizens continued to operate unprotected under these poor defenses, adding to the ever-growing number of fever victims.

For those who wished to avoid the grip of the fever in the city, flight from Memphis was appealing to a majority of the city's population. The news of deaths in New Orleans and in the nearby town of Hickman in August led to the mass withdrawal of an estimated 25,000 residents from the city of Memphis within four days, which led to further spread of the virus across the Lower Mississippi Valley. This exodus of a large proportion of the population of Memphis consisted primarily of those of the white Protestant class who possessed the means to leave the city for safety. Left behind were African American residents and a large circle of Irish Catholics who lacked the wealth to uproot from their homes located in the poorest sectors of town. The departure of white Protestants not only fueled the animosity that existed between the Catholics of the city and themselves, but also left Memphis ill-equipped in the manpower needed to sustain fever relief efforts. Consequently, the integral role Catholic clergy came to play in aiding fever victims was largely a product of the gap left by white Protestant flight.

In light of this reality, Catholic intervention in the path of the fever in Memphis becomes crucial to understanding the story of these devastating months. Catholic clergy opened their churches and convents to render aid on a non-discriminatory basis, aiding a community that would have remained insufficiently aided otherwise. Despite their extensive service during the epidemic years in Memphis, the involvement of Catholic clergy in fever relief efforts has largely gone undocumented. No explanation for their absence from fever records is confirmed. However, the death the Catholic community experienced was a blow from which their population would never recover, effecting a change in the character of Memphis felt deeply in the years after the fever had run its course.

In addition to extensive mortality, Memphis also saw an economic crisis during the epidemic, where trade was halted entirely in the city, and the lack of commerce led to mass starvations throughout the city, inciting riots and looting. All in all, Ellis states that " of the approximately 20,000 persons remaining in the city, an estimated 17,000 contracted the fever, of whom 5,150 died. There were at least 11,000 cases among 14,000 blacks, resulting in 946 deaths. By contrast, virtually all of the 6,000 whites were stricken, and 4,204 cases proved fatal. The disaster's economic cost to the city was later calculated to be upward of fifteen million dollars."

=== Mississippi ===
The 1878 epidemic was the worst that occurred in the state of Mississippi. Sometimes known as "Yellow Jack", and "Bronze John", devastated Mississippi socially and economically. Entire families were killed, while others fled their homes for the presumed safety of other parts of the state. Quarantine regulations, passed to prevent the spread of the disease, brought trade to a stop. Some local economies never recovered. Beechland, near Vicksburg, became a ghost town because of the epidemic. By the end of the year, 3,227 people had died from the disease.

In the town of Grenada located in northern Mississippi, about 1,000 people of the town's population fled while the remaining population suffered "approximately 1,050 cases and 350 deaths." The town was a known railroad town, and it was found that the refugees from railroad towns often spread the illness with them along the railroads.

== Aftermath ==
The epidemic lasted until late October when lower temperatures drove off the A. Aegypti mosquitoes, the primary carrier of yellow fever, away or into hibernation. It was not until November 19 when the epidemic was officially declared to be over. Ellis states that "according to estimates, there were around 120,000 cases of yellow fever and approximately 20,000 deaths." The Lower Mississippi Valley also experienced roughly $30 million in economic losses due to the disruption of commerce caused by the epidemic.

== See also ==
- List of notable disease outbreaks in the United States
- 1853 yellow fever epidemic
