= 2012–2013 United States flu season =

In comparison to other recent seasons, the 2012–2013 flu season was moderately severe, with a high percentage of outpatient visits for influenza-like illness (ILI), high rates of hospitalization (particularly among people 65 years and older), and more reported deaths attributed to pneumonia and influenza compared with recent years. This season had a somewhat early increase in flu activity through November and December, with a peak in late December. Influenza-like-illness rose quickly to well above the baseline of expected activity and remained elevated for 15 consecutive weeks, making this season slightly longer than average.

== Vaccination ==
For the 2012–2013 flu season, overall U.S. vaccination coverage was around 45% of people 6 months and older, with higher rates in children (around 57%) than adults (about 41.5%), showing slight increases from the prior year, though rates varied by state and demographic, with children aged 6–23 months having the highest uptake.

== See also ==
- United States influenza statistics by flu season
