= Immunocapitalism =

Concept about how immunity in pandemics can exacerbate inequality

Immunocapitalism describes the ways in which disease outbreaks and the acquisition of immunity are leveraged for economic and political gain. The concept highlights the intersection of health, capitalism, and power, demonstrating how social and economic inequalities are exacerbated by epidemics. In some cases, individuals actively attempt to contract a disease in order to become immune to it, because of resulting benefits to their socioeconomic status.

== Origin of term ==
Santa Clara University anthropologist Mythri Jegathesan states the term was first coined by Stanford historian Kathryn Olivarius. In her paper, "Immunity, Capital, and Power in Antebellum New Orleans," published in The American Historical Review in 2019, Olivarius examined 19th-century New Orleans, where yellow fever outbreaks were rampant. She further explored the concept in her 2022 book, Necropolis: Disease, Power, and Capitalism in the Cotton Kingdom. In both works, Olivarius argues that white New Orleans elites exploited the disease to their advantage, creating a system where immunity, or the lack thereof, became a form of capital. Those who were 'acclimated' to yellow fever, having survived the disease, were granted a form of social and economic capital, while the 'unacclimated', often marginalized groups, were exploited and seen as expendable. This historical context provides a framework for understanding how health inequalities can be exploited for economic and political gain.

It was further used during the COVID-19 pandemic, with assistant director of the Britain-based Nuffield Council on Bioethics Pete Mills declaring in a June 2020 report on the "Ethics of immunity testing" that "Economic incentives invite 'immunocapitalism'". Mills highlights the economic factors that prioritize COVID-19 immunity status explaining that employers might favor workers who are believed to be immune, as these individuals are perceived to be less likely to contract the virus, or transmit it to colleagues or customers.

- Yellow Fever in New Orleans: As described in Necropolis and Olivarius' earlier article, white elites in 19th-century New Orleans who survived yellow fever (and thus gained immunity) used their status to control the city's economy and politics. Immigrants and enslaved black people, lacking immunity, were seen as expendable and were forced into dangerous working conditions. A white man's perceived immunity became a form of social and economic capital. His health status translated into increased job opportunities, higher wages, easier promotions, and greater access to financial products like credit and insurance. Per Olivarius, different forms of capitalism emerge not solely due to market forces but because those in power leverage available resources to solidify their control. This applies not only to laws, demographics, and politics but also to diseases. In New Orleans, from the first yellow fever epidemic in 1796 to the last in 1905, the city's ruling class exploited disease risk for their benefit. Olivarius believes that this system of "immunocapitalism," resembles Naomi Klein's concept of "disaster capitalism," where governments or regimes capitalize on major disasters to implement policies and systems that would typically face resistance from the population. However, in New Orleans, the "shocks" weren't individual wars or invasions but recurring epidemics.
- COVID-19 Pandemic: The COVID-19 pandemic brought the concept of immunocapitalism into focus, raising discussions among academic philosophers about the potential for discrimination and commodification of immunity, invoking Olivarius' research. In The Pandemic Information Gap: The Brutal Economics of COVID-19, University of Toronto economist Joshua Gans states that "One could imagine innovative ways of rationing access to [COVID-19] tests when they are scarce, say, by testing in conjunction with blood donations, thereby encouraging that activity as people try to establish their immunocapital" Throughout his book, Gans cites Olivarius' work as a case study in what happens when immunity is commodified whereby lessons learned can be applied to the COVID pandemic.
