= United States influenza statistics by flu season =

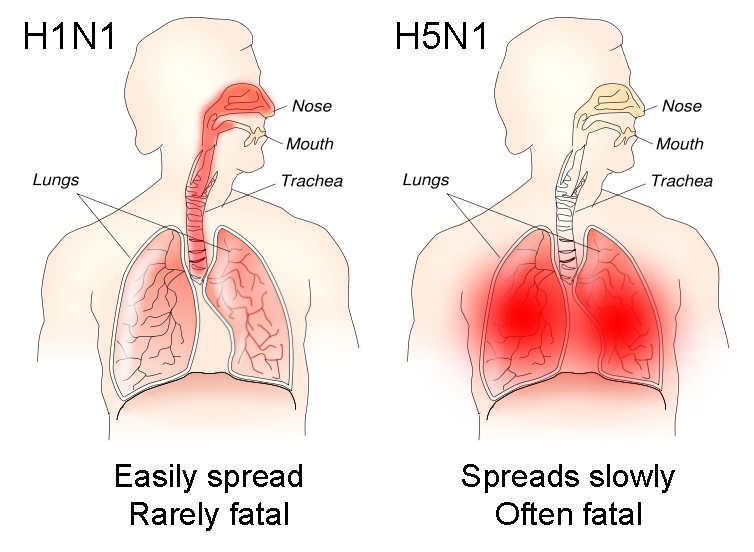
The different sites of infection (shown in red) of seasonal H1N1 versus avian H5N1. This influences their lethality and ability to spread.

US influenza statistics by flu season. From the Centers for Disease Control and Prevention page called "Disease Burden of Flu": "Each year CDC estimates the burden of influenza in the U.S. CDC uses modeling to estimate the number of flu illnesses, medical visits, hospitalizations, and deaths related to flu that occurred in a given season. The methods used to calculate these estimates are described on CDC’s webpage, How CDC Estimates the Burden of Seasonal Flu in the U.S."

The tables below include the latest available years the CDC has provided on their website.

== Hospitalizations and deaths ==
- UI = uncertainty interval.
- Row numbers are static. Other columns are sortable. This allows ranking of any column.

* 2019 to 2020 season is a preliminary estimate.

Estimated Influenza Disease Burden – United States
| Season | Hospitalizations | | Deaths | |
| Season | Estimate | 95% UI | Estimate | 95% UI |
|---|---|---|---|---|
| 2010–2011 | 290,000 | (270,000 – 350,000) | 37,000 | (32,000 – 51,000) |
| 2011–2012 | 140,000 | (130,000 – 190,000) | 12,000 | (11,000 – 23,000) |
| 2012–2013 | 570,000 | (530,000 – 680,000) | 43,000 | (37,000 – 57,000) |
| 2013–2014 | 350,000 | (320,000 – 390,000) | 38,000 | (33,000 – 50,000) |
| 2014–2015 | 590,000 | (540,000 – 680,000) | 51,000 | (44,000 – 64,000) |
| 2015–2016 | 280,000 | (220,000 – 480,000) | 23,000 | (17,000 – 35,000) |
| 2016–2017 | 500,000 | (380,000 – 860,000) | 38,000 | (29,000 – 61,000) |
| 2017–2018 | 710,000 | (560,000 – 1,100,000) | 52,000 | (37,000 – 95,500) |
| 2018–2019 | 380,000 | (300,000 – 660,000) | 28,000 | (19,000 – 97,000) |
| 2019–2020 | 380,000 | (312,000 – 630,000) | 20,000 | (18,000 – 80,000) |
| 2022–2023 | 360,000 | (299,000 – 678,000) | 21,000 | (19,000 – 58,000) |
| 2024–2025 | 770,000 | (700,000 – 800,000) | 38,000 | (20,000 - 40,000) |

== Symptomatic illnesses and medical visits ==
- UI = uncertainty interval.
- Row numbers are static. Other columns are sortable. This allows ranking of any column.

* 2019 to 2020 season is a preliminary estimate.

Estimated Influenza Disease Burden – United States
| Season | Symptomatic Illnesses | | Medical Visits | |
| Season | Estimate | 95% UI | Estimate | 95% UI |
|---|---|---|---|---|
| 2010–2011 | 21,000,000 | (20,000,000 – 25,000,000) | 10,000,000 | (9,300,000 – 12,000,000) |
| 2011–2012 | 9,300,000 | (8,700,000 – 12,000,000) | 4,300,000 | (4,000,000 – 5,600,000) |
| 2012–2013 | 34,000,000 | (32,000,000 – 38,000,000) | 16,000,000 | (15,000,000 – 18,000,000) |
| 2013–2014 | 30,000,000 | (28,000,000 – 33,000,000) | 13,000,000 | (12,000,000 – 15,000,000) |
| 2014–2015 | 30,000,000 | (29,000,000 – 33,000,000) | 14,000,000 | (13,000,000 – 16,000,000) |
| 2015–2016 | 24,000,000 | (20,000,000 – 33,000,000) | 11,000,000 | (9,000,000 – 15,000,000) |
| 2016–2017 | 29,000,000 | (25,000,000 – 45,000,000) | 14,000,000 | (11,000,000 – 23,000,000) |
| 2017–2018 | 41,000,000 | (35,500,000 – 53,000,000) | 21,000,000 | (18,000,000 – 27,000,000) |
| 2018–2019 | 29,000,000 | (25,000,000 – 40,000,000) | 17,000,000 | (11,500,000 – 18,500,000) |
| 2019–2020 | 35,000,000 | (30,000,000 – 49,000,000) | 16,000,000 | (14,000,000 – 22,000,000) |
| 2022-2023 | 35,000,000 | (30,000,000 – 49,000,000) | 14,000,000 | (12,000,000 – 24,000,000) |
| 2024-2025 | 56,000,000 | (47,000,000 – 82,000,000) | 21,000,000 | (16,000,000 – 30,000,000) |

== See also ==
- Influenza pandemic
- Influenza vaccine
