= 2024–2025 United States flu season =

2024-2025 influenza outbreak

The 2024–2025 United States flu season officially started in October 2024, with cases surging above the national baseline in late December 2024 and seeing a second peak in early February 2025. While a typical season can extend into May, the most significant activity for the 2024–2025 season concluded in April 2025, with influenza cases declining by summer. Since October 1, 2024, Centers for Disease Control and Prevention estimates there were 47-82 million flu cases, 21-37 million flu medical visits, 610,000-1,300,000 flu hospitalizations, and 27,000-130,000 flu deaths. There was a significant surge in flu activity, with Influenza A strains, particularly A/H1N1 and A/H3N2, being co-dominant. This season was one of the most intense compared to recent years, with high levels of flu-related hospitalizations and doctor visits.

== Geography ==
During the 2024–2025 flu season, the most severely impacted states included those in the Southern United States, the Southwestern United States, and the Western United States, with California reporting a particularly deadly season and states like Virginia and the District of Columbia also showing very high activity levels.

== Flu season severity ==
By March 2025, the 2024–25 flu season was considered to be the worst one in 15 years, with the highest hospitalization rates recorded in the US since the 2009 swine flu pandemic, and far exceeding the infection levels of any flu season since the lockdowns of the COVID-19 pandemic in early 2020.

== See also ==
- United States influenza statistics by flu season
