= Kathryn Olivarius =

American historian

Kathryn Olivarius (born 1989) is an American historian. She is an associate professor of history at Stanford University, where she has taught since 2017. Her research covers the 19th century United States, with a focus on the antebellum South, Caribbean, slavery, capitalism, and disease. Prior, she was a postdoctoral fellow the Institute of Historical Research at the University of London.

She received a B.A. in History from Yale University and a Masters and PhD. in U.S. History from the University of Oxford. At Yale, she was a frequent columnist for the Yale Daily News, the student newspaper.

== Research ==
Olivarius is mostly known for her 2020 book Necropolis: Disease, Power, and Capitalism in the Cotton Kingdom, which won her both international and national prizes such as the Dan David Prize, the world's largest (by prize amount) academic history award. In Necropolis, Olivarius examines how yellow fever shaped life in antebellum New Orleans. As part of her work, Olivarius has been credited with inventing the concept of "immunocapital," whereby attaining immunity to a given disease confers social, economic, and political advantages, in some cases reinforcing existing racial and class hierarchies. In antebellum New Orleans, wealthy elites used this immunity to maintain their dominance, as politicians resisted public health measures, arguing that acclimation through exposure was necessary for the working class.

In an April 2020 New York Times article, Olivarius critiques a proposal from conservative outlet The Federalist that advocated for young, healthy Americans to intentionally contract COVID-19 to build "herd immunity" and revive the economy. Drawing parallels to the yellow fever epidemics of 19th-century New Orleans, Olivarius warned that a similar dynamic could unfold with COVID-19, cautioning against allowing immunity to become a marker of privilege and deepen existing inequalities, particularly in employment and access to resources, as pandemics historically worsen social divides.

== Awards ==
- Dan David Prize (2024)
- Frederick Jackson Turner Award (2023) for Necropolis: Disease, Power, and Capitalism in the Cotton Kingdom
- American Historical Association Prize for American History (2023) for Necropolis: Disease, Power, and Capitalism in the Cotton Kingdom
- Francis B. Simkins Award from the Southern Historical Association (2023) for Necropolis: Disease, Power, and Capitalism in the Cotton Kingdom.
