= Necropolis: Disease, Power, and Capitalism in the Cotton Kingdom =

2022 book

- Author: Kathryn Olivarius
- Genre: 19th century American history
- Publisher: Belknap Press (Owned by Harvard University Press)
- Publication date: April 19, 2022
- ISBN: 9780674241053

Necropolis: Disease, Power, and Capitalism in the Cotton Kingdom is a book written by Stanford history professor Kathryn Olivarius. Published in 2022, it explores the intersection of yellow fever, slavery, and capitalism in 19th century New Orleans by introducing the concept of immunocapitalism. This term describes how white New Orleanians who survived yellow fever gained social and economic advantages by attaining immunity. Their "immunocapital" opened doors to jobs, loans, and political power, reinforcing existing racial hierarchies.

== Summary ==
Olivarius states early on in the book that "All forms of capitalism- war, necro-, racial, industrial- arise not because of the irresistible logic of the market but because powerful actors mobilize the materials at their disposal to consolidate their dominance." She further emphasizes that the system of "immunocapitalism," resembles Naomi Klein's concept of "disaster capitalism," in the sense that governments or regimes capitalize on major disasters to implement policies and systems that would typically face resistance from the population. However, in New Orleans, Olivarius argues, the "shocks" weren't individual wars or invasions but recurring epidemics.

Throughout the book, Olivarius argues that yellow fever, a deadly disease rampant in New Orleans, played a crucial role in shaping the city's social and economic structures. The book highlights how white elites, who often survived yellow fever and gained immunity, leveraged their "immunocapital" to consolidate power and wealth. This created a system where immunity became a form of currency, granting access to economic opportunities, social status, and political influence. This system allowed these elites to profit from the city's position as a major trading port, but it also led to the deaths of many people.

Conversely, enslaved people and free people of color, who were disproportionately affected by the disease due to their living conditions and lack of access to healthcare, were further marginalized. Their vulnerability to yellow fever reinforced existing inequalities and perpetuated their exploitation within the slave economy.

=== Yellow fever denialism ===
Necropolis argues that yellow fever epidemics in New Orleans were exacerbated by a culture of denial and delusion fostered by the Southern elite and newspapers. This culture, rooted in economic motivations and a desire to portray the South as a healthy and prosperous region, led to the suppression of information about yellow fever outbreaks and an active promotion of misinformation. One manifestation of this denial was the reliance on the concept of acclimation. Acclimation was the belief that once a person had survived a bout of yellow fever, they were immune to future infections and thus acclimated to the Southern environment. This belief was used to downplay the dangers of yellow fever and promote the idea that the South was a safe place to live. Boosters of Southern cities like New Orleans actively spread the idea that yellow fever was only a danger to newcomers and that the acclimated population was healthy and thriving. Newcomers were encouraged to adopt this viewpoint and share it with their families and friends back home, further spreading the misinformation.

The book provides examples of individuals who had recently immigrated to the South echoing these sentiments in letters to their relatives, downplaying the risks of yellow fever and emphasizing the economic opportunities available in the region. They often repeated the claim that yellow fever only affected those who were already weak or unhealthy, particularly the poor and Irish immigrants.

This culture of denial and delusion had serious consequences, as it prevented effective public health measures from being implemented and contributed to the continued spread of yellow fever. The suppression of information and the promotion of misinformation kept the public in the dark about the true extent of the danger and prevented them from taking necessary precautions.

== Reviews ==
Writing in the Journal of Southern History, Kevin McQueeney, an assistant professor at Nicholls State University, states that the book "offers an important examination of the interplay of slavery, capitalism, empire, and public health... and is based on an impressive blend of archival sources, Necropolis is an engrossing and timely work of scholarship."

Viola Franziska Müller, a social historian at the University of Bonn, notes that "Necropolis positions itself at the intersection of the histories of slavery and medicine, a field that has produced a number of extremely insightful works in the past decade... The most recent global pandemic has further intensified the scholarly engagement with medicine and science, and also Olivarius must have written parts of this book when the COVID-19 pandemic was in full swing".

Duke University historian Margaret Humphreys calls Olivarius' work an "excellent reconsideration" of the impact of yellow fever on New Orleans. She praises Olivarius's "rich" descriptions and her ability to "adeptly" resurrect voices from the past, including those of women, the impoverished, and former slaves. However, Humphreys also notes that the book's coverage of the period from 1860 to 1900 feels rushed and suggests that Olivarius may have originally planned to end her analysis at the start of the American Civil War. Despite this, Humphreys concludes that Necropolis is a valuable contribution to the scholarship on yellow fever and the South, and she particularly highlights Olivarius's analysis of the "complex of ideas" that allowed the city's elite to maintain their power in the face of disease.

Katherine Johnston, a faculty member at Montana State University, believes that Olivarius's use of various sources, such as personal letters, newspapers, medical manuals, magazines, public ordinances, hospital internal records, first-person slave narratives, court cases, and records of insurance companies delivers an "incriminating portrait" of New Orleans' elite who "came to embrace yellow fever... to consolidate their own power."

== Awards ==
- Frederick Jackson Turner Award (2023)
- Prize in American History by the American Historical Association
- James Broussard Book Prize by the Society for Historians of the Early American Republic (SHEAR) (2022)
- Williams Prize by The Historic New Orleans Collection (2022)
