= 2017–2018 United States flu season =

2017–2018 influenza outbreak

The 2017–2018 United States flu season lasted from late 2017 through early 2018. The predominant strain of influenza was H3N2. During the spring months of March–May, influenza B virus became dominant.

In all states except Hawaii and Oregon, the distribution of influenza was indicated as widespread, including 32 states that had high flu activity. The flu season was exacerbated by a shortage of IV bags caused by IV bag plant closures in Puerto Rico following Hurricane Maria. The CDC estimates that 52,000 Americans died due to influenza during the 2017–2018 flu season.

== Effects ==
The United States Centers for Disease Control and Prevention (CDC) began counting the 2017–2018 "flu season" as October 2017, and by early February 2018, the epidemic was still widespread and increasing overall. By February 2018, the CDC said that the circulating virus strains included both B strains (Yamagata and Victoria), H1N1 and H3N2. On 10 February 2018, Bloomberg reported that influenza in the United States was killing up to 4,000 Americans a week, likely to far outstrip the rate of deaths in the 2009–2010 pandemic season. Anne Schuchat, then-acting director of the CDC, said that the main type of the flu that year had not "changed enough from previous seasons to be considered a novel strain." In the first week of February, deaths from influenza and pneumonia were responsible for one of every ten deaths in the US, with 4,064 from pneumonia or influenza recorded in the third week of 2018, according to CDC data. The CDC also reported 63 child deaths at that point, half of which were not considered medically high risk, and only about 20 percent who were vaccinated. Only two of those deaths were babies under six months old.

The 2017–2018 flu season was severe for all US populations and resulted in an estimated 41 million cases, 710,000 hospitalizations and 52,000 deaths. This is the highest number of illnesses since the 2009 flu season, when there were an estimated 60 million cases. According to the Centers for Disease Control and Prevention, during the 2017–2018 season the percentage of deaths attributed to pneumonia and influenza (P&I) was at or above the epidemic threshold for 16 consecutive weeks. Nationally, mortality attributed to P&I exceeded 10.0% for four consecutive weeks, peaking at 10.8% during the week ending January 20, 2018. A preliminary estimate (September 2018) attributed more than 80,000 US deaths to influenza this season, but this was later revised down to 52,000 in light of more complete information. While 186 pediatric deaths were reported to the CDC, it is estimated that there were in reality more than 600 total pediatric deaths nationwide related to influenza. This estimation of three times the reported pediatric deaths was arrived at based on the observation that about two-thirds of children who died with a suspected viral background were not tested for influenza.

=== New York ===
On 10 February 2018, officials in New York City confirmed the third pediatric flu death for the 2017–2018 season. The week prior, 43 states reported high patient traffic for the flu, with flu remaining widespread in each state except Hawaii and Oregon.

=== California ===
California was hit especially hard. In California as of 6 January 2018, twenty-seven people under the age of 65 died from flu since October, nine times as many as the prior year. The Ronald Reagan UCLA Medical Center emergency room, which often caters to about 140 patients daily, had more than 200 patients on one of those days. By 19 January, seventy-four people under the age of 65 had died in California, with thirty-two of those deaths occurring in the preceding week, making it the deadliest week of the flu season so far.

By 9 February 2018, the national rate for flu-like symptoms for patients visiting clinics had reached "well above" seven percent, a rate last seen during the H1N1 swine flu pandemic of 2009. According to the Los Angeles Times, 163 people under the age of 65 had died of the flu since October 2017, compared to 40 deaths during the same time period the previous year. Of those 163 deaths, 36 had died during the first week of February; the same article also noted that the peak of the flu season has apparently passed as reports of new cases have declined.

=== Washington state ===
On 11 February 2018, the Seattle Times reported that "things [were] improving" in Washington state. At the time, the state had seen 151 flu-related fatalities, lower than the total of 214 that time the year before.

=== Delaware ===
On 12 February 2018, Delaware announced that it had seen six deaths and 995 confirmed flu cases in seven days, making it the state's highest weekly total on record.

=== Minnesota ===
On 11 February 2018, United States Senator Amy Klobuchar from Minnesota announced a new bill called the Flu Vaccine Act, calling for further research on a better vaccine at the US National Institutes of Health. At the time, there had been 400 outbreaks of flu that season in Minnesota's schools, and 130 outbreaks in long-term care facilities, with one child in the state dying. Additionally, Klobuchar continued to push the US Food and Drug Administration to fix the national IV bag and saline shortage, for adversely affecting the treatment of flu symptoms.

=== Alabama ===
On 11 January 2018, Alabama governor Kay Ivey declared a state of emergency due to the state's "overwhelmed" health care facilities, potentially affecting their ability to care for patients "in the traditional, normal, and customary manner".

== Analysis ==
According to the director of the Centers for Disease Control and Prevention's influenza branch in January 2018, it was the first flu season where "we've had the entire continental US" show the same "widespread" flu activity, excluding the District of Columbia and Hawaii. Twenty-six of those states were classified by the CDC as having "high" activity in January 2018.

In January 2018, analyzing the reason for the spike, The Atlantic noted that the flu season was possibly worse because the dominant circulating strain was the H3N2 strain, which for unknown reasons tends to hit humans harder than other strains and result in worse flu seasons when dominant. Also, the H3N2 strain, according to the CDC, affects elderly and young children more than other strains, resulting in more severe hospitalizations and deaths.

The Atlantic also noted that the 2017 vaccine for the flu was only ten percent effective against H3N2 in Australia. As the typical practice of studying and creating the current vaccines in chicken eggs tends to result in mutations, 2017 was the first year that researchers used dog cells rather than chicken eggs to create the H3N2 component of the vaccine Flucelvax. However, due to cost, most Americans did not get Flucelvax in 2017 and 2018 and likely received vaccines grown with chicken eggs. The Atlantic noted that the vaccine still protected against other strains such as the H1N1 and B virus, and did provide at least some immunity to H3N2.

In January 2018, The Atlantic also noted that the severity of the flu season in the United States may have been increased by a shortage of IV bags in hospitals. The shortage resulted from the Hurricane Maria blackout in Puerto Rico, where a large amount of medical supplies are manufactured. The article noted that hospitals normally go through hundreds of IV bags a day to replenish fluids and give drugs, but during the shortage, some hospitals had resorted to directly injecting drugs into the vein via an IV push. Time also published an article in 2018 arguing that the United States had become complacent concerning the flu, and that more needed to be done.

== See also ==
- United States influenza statistics by flu season
