= 2020s in medicine =

This is a list of events associated with medicine in the 2020s. Notable events of the decade include the COVID-19 pandemic.

== 2020 ==
- 2020–2025 H5N1 outbreak
- 2020–2023 H5N8 outbreak
- 2020 dengue outbreak in Singapore

=== January ===
- 09: A 61-year old male in Wuhan, Hubei, China became the first known death from COVID-19.
- 13: Thailand confirmed their first case of COVID-19. This is the first confirmed case of COVID-19 outside of China.
- 16: Japan confirmed their first case of COVID-19.
- 20: South Korea and the United States confirmed their first cases of COVID-19. This marks the first time COVID-19 has been confirmed outside of Asia and the first confirmed case in North America.
- 21: Taiwan confirmed their first case of COVID-19.
- 22: Hong Kong and Macau confirmed their first cases of COVID-19.
- 23: Nepal, Singapore and Vietnam confirmed their first cases of COVID-19.
- 24: France confirmed their first case of COVID-19. This marks the first confirmed case of COVID-19 in Europe.
- 25: Australia, Canada and Malaysia confirmed their first cases of COVID-19. This marks the first time COVID-19 has been confirmed in Oceania.
- 27: Cambodia, Germany and Sri Lanka confirmed their first cases of COVID-19.
- 29: Finland and the United Arab Emirates confirmed their first cases of COVID-19. This marks the first time COVID-19 has been confirmed in the Middle East.
- 30: The WHO declares COVID-19 a public health emergency of international concern.
- 30: India, Italy and the Philippines confirmed their first cases of COVID-19.
- 31: Russia, Spain, Sweden and the United Kingdom confirmed their first cases of COVID-19.

=== February ===
- 03: Belgium confirms their first case of COVID-19.
- 14: Egypt confirms their first case of COVID-19. This marks the first time COVID-19 has been confirmed in Africa.
- 19: Iran confirms their first case of COVID-19.
- 21: Israel and Lebanon confirmed their first cases of COVID-19.
- 24: Afghanistan, Bahrain, Iraq, Kuwait and Oman confirmed their first cases of COVID-19.
- 25: Algeria, Austria, Brazil, Croatia and Switzerland confirmed their first cases of COVID-19. This marks the first time COVID-19 has been confirmed in South America.
- 26: Georgia, Greece, North Macedonia, Norway, Pakistan and Romania confirmed their first cases of COVID-19.
- 27: Denmark, Estonia, the Netherlands, Nigeria and San Marino confirmed their first cases of COVID-19.
- 28: Azerbaijan, Belarus, Iceland, Lithuania, Mexico, Monaco and New Zealand confirmed their first cases of COVID-19.
- 29: Ecuador, Ireland, Luxembourg and Qatar confirmed their first cases of COVID-19.

=== March ===
- 01: Armenia, Czechia and the Dominican Republic confirmed their first cases of COVID-19.
- 02: Andorra, Indonesia, Jordan, Latvia, Morocco, Portugal, Saudi Arabia, Senegal and Tunisia confirmed their first cases of COVID-19.
- 03: Argentina, Chile, Liechtenstein and Ukraine confirmed their first cases of COVID-19.
- 04: Hungary, Poland and Slovenia confirmed their first cases of COVID-19.
- 05: Bosnia and Herzegovina, the State of Palestine and South Africa confirmed their first cases of COVID-19.
- 06: Bhutan, Cameroon, Colombia, Costa Rica, Peru, Serbia, Slovakia, Togo and Vatican City confirmed their first cases of COVID-19.
- 07: Maldives, Malta, Moldova and Paraguay confirmed their first cases of COVID-19.
- 08: Albania, Bangladesh and Bulgaria confirmed their first cases of COVID-19.
- 09: Brunei, Cyprus and Panama confirmed their first cases of COVID-19.
- 10: Bolivia, Burkina Faso, DR Congo, Jamaica and Mongolia confirmed their first cases of COVID-19.
- 11: The WHO declared COVID-19 a pandemic, having then reached 118,000 cases in 110 countries.
- 11: Cuba, Guyana, Honduras, Ivory Coast and Turkey confirmed their first cases of COVID-19.
- 12: Saint Vincent and the Grenadines and Trinidad and Tobago confirmed their first cases of COVID-19.
- 13: Antigua and Barbuda, Ethiopia, Gabon, Ghana, Guatemala, Guinea, Kazakhstan, Kenya, Kosovo, Saint Lucia, Sudan,Suriname, Uruguay and Venezuela confirmed their first cases of COVID-19.
- 14: Central African Republic, Congo, Equatorial Guinea, Eswatini, Mauritania, Namibia, Rwanda and the Seychelles confirmed their first cases of COVID-19.
- 15: The Bahamas and Uzbekistan confirmed their first cases of COVID-19.
- 16: Benin, Liberia, Somalia and Tanzania confirmed their first cases of COVID-19.
- 17: Barbados, the Gambia and Montenegro confirmed their first cases of COVID-19.
- 18: Djibouti, El Salvador, Kyrgyzstan, Mauritius, Nicaragua and Zambia confirmed their first cases of COVID-19.
- 19: Angola, Chad, Fiji, Haiti and Niger confirmed their first cases of COVID-19.
- 20: Cape Verde, Madagascar, Papua New Guinea, Timor-Leste, Uganda and Zimbabwe confirmed their first cases of COVID-19.
- 21: Eritrea confirms their first case of COVID-19.
- 22: Dominica, Grenada, Mozambique and Syria confirmed their first cases of COVID-19.
- 23: Belize and Myanmar confirmed their first cases of COVID-19.
- 24: Laos and Libya confirmed their first cases of COVID-19.
- 25: Guinea-Bissau, Mali and Saint Kitts and Nevis confirmed their first cases of COVID-19.
- 30: Botswana confirms their first case of COVID-19.
- 31: Burundi and Sierra Leone confirmed their first cases of COVID-19.

=== April ===
- 02: Malawi confirms their first case of COVID-19.
- 05: South Sudan confirms their first case of COVID-19.
- 06: São Tomé and Príncipe confirms their first case of COVID-19.
- 10: Yemen confirms their first case of COVID-19.
- 30: Comoros and Tajikistan confirmed their first cases of COVID-19.

=== May ===
- 13: Lesotho confirms their first case of COVID-19.

=== June ===
- 25: The Kivu Ebola epidemic in the Democratic Republic of the Congo is declared over, as no new cases had been reported since 27 April.

=== October ===
- 03: The Solomon Islands confirms their first case of COVID-19.
- 05: The Nobel Prize in Physiology or Medicine was jointly awarded to Harvey J. Alter, Michael Houghton and Charles M. Rice "for the discovery of Hepatitis C virus".
- 28: The Marshall Islands confirms their first case of COVID-19.

=== November ===
- 11: Vanuatu confirms their first case of COVID-19.
- 18: Samoa confirms their first case of COVID-19.

=== December ===
- 21: The first case of COVID-19 is confirmed at the Antarctic Chilean research station Base General Bernardo O'Higgins Riquelme. This marks the first time COVID-19 has been confirmed in Antarctica.

== 2021 ==
- 2021 South Sudan disease outbreak
- 2021 Guinea Marburg virus disease outbreak

=== January ===
- 08: Micronesia confirms their first case of COVID-19.

=== May ===
- 13: Kiribati confirms their first case of COVID-19.
- 31: Palau confirms their first case of COVID-19.

=== October ===
- 04: The Nobel Prize in Physiology or Medicine was jointly awarded to David Julius and Ardem Patapoutian "for their discoveries of receptors for temperature and touch".
- 29: Tonga confirms their first case of COVID-19.

== 2022 ==
- 2022–2023 mpox outbreak
- 2022 Ghana Marburg virus disease outbreak
- 2022 hepatitis of unknown origin in children
- 2022 Langya virus outbreak in China
- 2022–2023 pediatric care crisis
- 2022–2024 Southern Africa cholera outbreak
- 2022–2023 United Kingdom group A streptococcus outbreak
- 2022 Tucumán legionellosis outbreak
- Lumpy skin disease outbreak in India
- 2022–2023 Uganda Ebola outbreak

=== April ===
- 02: Nauru confirms their first case of COVID-19.

=== May ===
- 08: North Korea confirms their first case of COVID-19.
- 20: Tuvalu confirms their first case of COVID-19.

=== October ===
- 03: The Nobel Prize in Physiology or Medicine was awarded to Svante Pääbo "for his discoveries concerning the genomes of extinct hominins and human evolution".

== 2023 ==
- 2022–2023 United States P. aeruginosa outbreak in eye drops
- 2023 Calgary E. coli outbreak
- 2023 dengue outbreak in Jamaica
- 2023 Equatorial Guinea Marburg virus disease outbreak
- 2023 Ohio pneumonia outbreak
- 2023 Tanzania Marburg virus disease outbreak
- 2023–2024 Oropouche virus disease outbreak
- 2023–2024 cholera outbreak in South Africa
- 2023–2024 Zimbabwe cholera outbreak
- 2023 dengue outbreak in Bangladesh
- 2023 Mexico Meningitis outbreak
- Pink eye outbreak in Pakistan
- 2023 Chinese pneumonia outbreak
- Queenstown cryptosporidiosis outbreak
- 2023–2024 Zambian cholera outbreak

=== January ===
- 04: The WHO declared that "[n]o level of alcohol consumption is safe for our health".

=== October ===
- 02: The Nobel Prize in Physiology or Medicine was jointly awarded to Katalin Karikó and Drew Weissman "for their discoveries concerning nucleoside base modifications that enabled the development of effective mRNA vaccines against COVID-19".

== 2024 ==
- Sudanese cholera epidemic (2024–present)
- 2024 dengue epidemic in Argentina
- 2024 dengue outbreak in Latin America and the Caribbean
- 2024 Gaza Strip polio epidemic
- 2024 Kwango province malaria outbreak
- 2024 McDonald's E. coli outbreak
- 2024 Russian botulism outbreak
- 2024 United Kingdom Shigatoxigenic E. coli outbreak
- 2024–2025 Kansas tuberculosis outbreak
- 2024–2025 United States flu season
- HMPV seasonal outbreak in China (2024)
- Rwanda Marburg virus disease outbreak

=== October ===
- 07: The Nobel Prize in Physiology or Medicine was jointly awarded to Victor Ambros and Gary Ruvkun "for the discovery of microRNA and its role in post-transcriptional gene regulation".

== 2025 ==
- 2025 Belize measles outbreak
- 2025 Équateur province malaria outbreak
- 2025 Ethiopian Marburg virus disease outbreak
- 2025 Kasaï Province Ebola outbreak
- 2025 New Zealand measles outbreak
- 2025 United States measles outbreak
- 2025 Uganda Ebola outbreak

=== January ===
- 29: The hormone Raptin is discovered and named.

=== August ===
- 25: Botswana declared a national public health emergency over shortages of medicines and medical equipment.

=== September ===
- 10: UNICEF declared that globally children and adolescents are now more likely to be obese than underweight.

=== October ===
- 06: The Nobel Prize in Physiology or Medicine was jointly awarded to Mary E. Brunkow, Fred Ramsdell and Shimon Sakaguchi "for their discoveries concerning peripheral immune tolerance".

=== December ===
- 10: In Australia, the Online Safety Amendment introduced a social media ban for under-16s. Australia's public broadcaster ABC News describes it as "a world-first push to protect children from phone addiction and online harms."

== 2026 ==
=== May ===
- 26: The American Cancer Society announces that the Guardant Health Shield blood test, which was approved by the U.S. FDA in 2024, will be included as an option for colorectal cancer screenings amidst a rise in colon cancer cases in young adults.

== See also ==
- 2010s in medicine
- Timeline of medicine and medical technology
- Timeline of the COVID-19 pandemic
