= 2024 dengue outbreak in Latin America and the Caribbean =

Disease epidemic in Latin America and the Caribbean

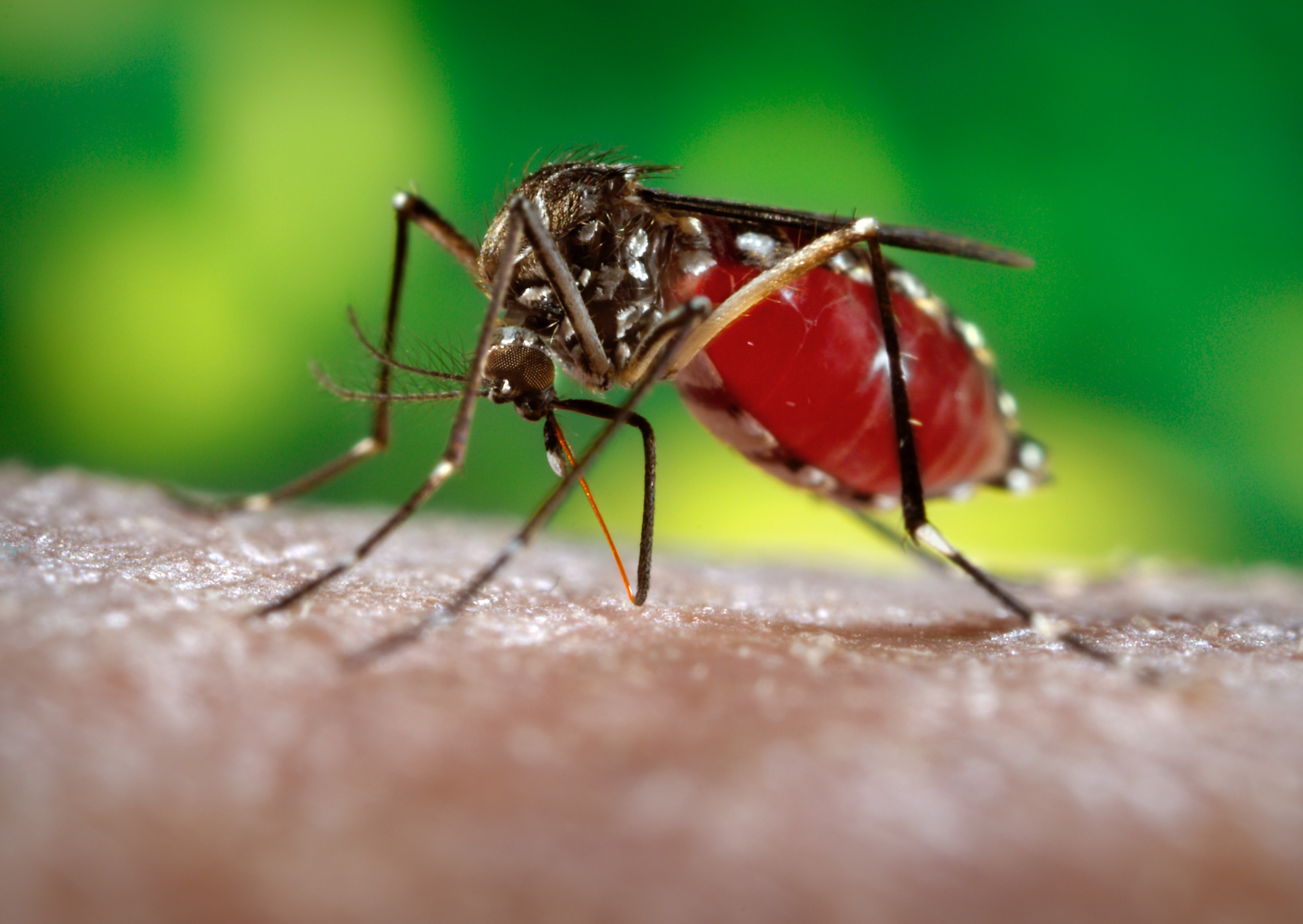
- Aedes aegypti
- Disease: Dengue fever
- Pathogen: Dengue virus Serotypes: DENV1, DENV2, DENV3 and DENV4
- Location: Mexico, North America (Florida only), Central America, South America, the Caribbean
- Suspected cases: 13 million+ (2024); 3.74 million (as of September 5, 2025); 1.84 million (as of 2026); 18.58 million (total)
- Severe cases: 22,684+ (2024); 4,513 (as of August 1, 2025); 3598 (as of 2026); 30,795 (total)
- Deaths: 8,186+ (2024); 1,689 (as of August 1, 2025); 616 (as of 2026); 10,491 (total)
- Fatality rate: 0.056%
- Territories: South America: Brazil, Argentina, Paraguay, Peru, Ecuador, Colombia; Central America: Honduras, Nicaragua, Belize, Panama, El Salvador, Guatemala; North America: Mexico, United States (Florida, Hawaii, and Puerto Rico only)

During the 2024 dengue outbreak in Latin America and the Caribbean, the number of reported infections surpassed historical records in several nations, with 13,063,434 suspected cases reported across the Americas over the course of 2024. Case numbers fell sharply afterwards, to 4,459,521 suspected cases and 2,207 deaths in 2025 — a 66% decrease in cases and a 74% decrease in deaths compared with 2024. 7,983+ severe cases from epidemiological week (EW) 19 were reported on 31 May 2024, while the 8,140,210 suspected cases at EW 19 reflect a 226% increase compared to 2023's outbreak up to EW 19, and a 416% increase compared to the annual average number of cases of the last 5 years.

The impacted countries include Brazil, Argentina, Paraguay, Uruguay, Peru, Ecuador, and Colombia in South America; Honduras, Nicaragua, Belize, Panama, El Salvador, Costa Rica, and Guatemala in Central America; and Mexico in North America.

== Causes ==
A comprehensive multinational study published in Nature Communications found that climate change and increased human mobility were significant factors contributing to the rapid acceleration in the spread of dengue. Annual increases in temperatures, humidity levels, and rainfall amounts each provide more favorable conditions for the Aedes aegypti mosquito to breed and spread, and making it so previously unaffected regions gradually develop a climate more favorable for dengue spreading.

The study also stated that rapid urbanization and population growth in cities led to poor urban planning, waste management, sanitation, and access to clean water further help incubate mosquito spread.

Other studies indicate that the increased temperatures related to the El Niño weather pattern also contributed to the exceptionally high number of dengue fever cases and area covered.

== Outbreak ==
=== Central America ===
Four dengue virus serotypes: DENV1, DENV2, DENV3 and DENV4, were found to be simultaneously circulating in all of the impacted countries in Central America aside from El Salvador, which currently only had DENV1, DENV2, and DENV3 confirmed.

==== Honduras ====
The number of reported infections rapidly escalated in February to March to reach epidemic classification. The continued increase in rate of infection led to the national government issuing an epidemiological national emergency on 31 May 2024. As of 24 May 2024, based on a report made by the World Health Organization, 20,563 dengue cases were reported, of which 266 (1.29%) were classified as severe infections, with 27 deaths of which 11 deaths were confirmed to have been directly caused by the infection. From EW 19, there was a 445% increase in reported cases compared to EW 19 in Honduras's dengue outbreak in 2023, and 193% compared to the average number of annual dengue infections in the past 5 years. The greatest concentration of cases are currently ongoing in the departments of Tegucigalpa, Cortés, San Pedro Sula, Bay Islands, Atlántida, and La Paz.

Reasons for the increase in cases from the prior year include logistical and personnel shortages in the national health secretariat, including shortages in chemical supplies, fumigation equipment, and vehicles. Another possible factor regards economic disparities in marginalized urban areas leading to delays in treatment allowing for the infection to spread in the densely populated environment. Poor waste management, water collection practices, and sanitation in part due to shortages of cleaning supplies prevented the disease from being contained.

==== Guatemala ====
From the beginning of 2024 to EW 14, 12,570 cases were reported in Guatemala, of which 1,086 were lab-confirmed cases and 20 were severe cases. The number of cases increased to 480% relative to EW 14 in 2023 and 599% compared to the annual average across the last 5 years. 9 deaths have been reported, with a fatality rate of 0.072%.

==== Panama ====
From the beginning of 2024 to EW 18, 5,882 dengue cases were reported, 4,141 (70%) were lab-confirmed, and 27 (0.45%) were severe cases. The number of cases increased to 155% relative to EW 18 in 2023, and 288% compared to the annual average across the last 5 years. 9 deaths have been reported, with a fatality rate of 0.153%.

=== South America ===
==== Brazil ====
At EW 19 in Late May, Brazil made up the vast majority of cases of dengue fever reported in Latin America and the Caribbean in 2024, with 83% of suspected cases arising from Brazil, along with 79.4% of deaths. 6,803,727 cases were reported, and 2,897 deaths have been reported.

Reasons for why Brazil has such a high number of cases include long-term underinvestment in water and sanitation infrastructure especially in poorer urban slums, forcing citizens to store water in open tanks that provides standing water for mosquitos to lay eggs in.

In order to slow the spread of the disease and work to achieve herd immunity, Brazil preemptively purchased the entire global stock of Qdenga dengue two-dose vaccine made by the Japanese pharmaceutical company Takeda in January 2024. However, only six million doses were planned to be created for 2024, which would only be enough to vaccinate 1.5% of the population of Brazil. A research study found that Takeda's TAK-003 vaccine was effective against symptomatic dengue and reduced hospitalization in adolescents.

==== Colombia ====
From the beginning of 2024 to EW 11, Colombia reported 69,837 cases, an increase of 262% relative to the annual average of cases up to EW 11 across the last 5 years. 9 deaths have been reported. The cumulative incidence rate was reported as 136 cases per 100,000 people.

==== Ecuador ====
From the beginning of 2024 to EW 11, Ecuador reported 13,075 cases, an increase of 277% relative to the annual average of cases up to EW 11 across the last 5 years, and a cumulative incidence rate was reported as 136 cases per 100,000 people. By EW 19, 31 deaths were reported.

==== Peru ====
79,741 cases were reported from EW 1 to EW 11, a 471% increase relative to the 5-year average at EW 11 with a cumulative incidence rate of 239 cases per 100,000 people.

=== Mexico ===
65,758 cases of dengue fever have been reported up to EW 19 in Mexico, accounting for 0.8% of total cases in Latin America and the Caribbean in 2024. 405 severe cases and 20 deaths have been reported so far in Mexico, with a fatality rate of 0.03%. DENV1, DENV2, DENV3 and DENV4 serotypes have been detected in Mexico. The states with the most cases were Guerrero, Tabasco, and Quintana Roo, as of EW 11.

The Caribbean

In 2024, dengue activity surged across the Caribbean, with multiple island nations reporting significantly higher case counts compared to previous years. Regional health data indicates nearly 57,000 cases were reported—representing a 469% increase from the same period in 2023.

Antigua and Barbuda: Between January and late May 2024, Antigua and Barbuda recorded 41 confirmed dengue cases. In response, health authorities ramped up mosquito control efforts, promoted neighborhood clean-ups, and launched educational outreach initiatives.

Aruba: Aruba reported 16 dengue cases during the same reporting period. To mitigate further spread, public health campaigns focused on mosquito bite prevention and encouraged the use of repellents and household screening.

Barbados: As of May 25, 2024, Barbados had documented 1,260 dengue cases. The national response included enhanced fogging operations and a grassroots education campaign urging residents to eliminate potential mosquito breeding sites.

Bonaire, Saint Eustatius, and Saba: These Dutch Caribbean territories collectively reported 207 dengue infections. Local health agencies coordinated efforts to bolster surveillance and deploy regional vector control teams.

Dominican Republic: The Dominican Republic experienced a noticeable increase in dengue cases during the first half of 2024, significantly contributing to the region's outbreak burden. Targeted mosquito control interventions were launched in densely populated and high-risk communities.

French Guiana: A rise in cases was also noted in French Guiana. Authorities strengthened outbreak preparedness and prioritized rapid detection and response measures.

Grenada: Grenada reported 153 confirmed dengue cases and one dengue-related death between January and late May 2024. The Ministry of Health responded with intensified mosquito fogging, public awareness campaigns, and coordination with regional partners to strengthen surveillance and control efforts.

Guyana: Guyana reported over 41,000 dengue cases in 2024, making it the most affected country in the Caribbean. In light of the scale of the outbreak, the government declared a public health emergency and directed additional resources toward healthcare services and vector control programs.

Jamaica: Jamaica documented 1,234 dengue cases in the first five months of 2024. In response, the Ministry of Health launched emergency vector control campaigns, fogging operations, and mass media messaging to encourage community action in mosquito source reduction.

Martinique: Martinique faced a sustained increase in dengue transmission. Public health responses included distributing insecticide-treated bed nets and conducting neighborhood assessments to identify and eliminate breeding sites.

Puerto Rico: Puerto Rico confirmed 6,291 dengue cases in 2024, surpassing the epidemic threshold and leading to an official public health emergency

== Statistical data ==
=== South America ===
Territory	Suspected Cases	Deaths	Proportion of Suspected Cases	Proportion of Deaths
Brazil	6,803,727	6,216	83%	79.4%
Argentina	475,743	325	6.0%	9.0%
Paraguay	266,816	91	3.3%	2.5%
Peru	222,950	174	2.7%	4.7%
Colombia	137,175	62	1.6%	1.6%
Ecuador	13,075 (EW 11)	31 (EW 19)		0.8%

=== Central America ===
Territory	Suspected Cases	Confirmed Cases	Severe Cases	Deaths	Yearly increase in suspected cases
Honduras	20,563	1,248 (6.0%)	266 (1.29%)	27 (0.131%)	445%
Guatemala	12,570	1,086 (8.6%)	20 (0.16%)	9 (0.072%)	480%
Panama	5,882	4,141 (70%)	27 (0.45%)	9 (0.153%)	155%

==== Honduras ====
State	Number of Cases
Tegucigalpa	551
Cortés	409
San Pedro Sula	355
La Paz	128
Atlántida	115

Summary of Dengue Cases and Response Measures in the Caribbean (2024)
Country/Territory	Reported Cases	Deaths	Notable Response Measures
Antigua and Barbuda	41	0	Clean-up campaigns and public education
Aruba	16	0	Bite prevention awareness and repellent use
Barbados	1,260	N/A	Fogging and household education outreach
Bonaire, Saint Eustatius, and Saba	207	N/A	Regional coordination and vector control
Dominican Republic	N/A	N/A	Community fogging and control in urban areas
French Guiana	N/A	N/A	Enhanced surveillance and outbreak readiness
Grenada	153	1	Intensified fogging and public messaging
Guyana	41,000+	N/A	Emergency declared, health resources scaled up
Jamaica	1,234	N/A	Emergency campaigns and community engagement
Martinique	N/A	N/A	Bed net distribution and site inspections
Puerto Rico	6,291	11	Emergency declaration, youth most affected
Trinidad and Tobago	825	8	Mobile clinics, fogging, health outreach
U.S. Virgin Islands (St. Croix)	208	N/A	Localized control and public education

== See also ==
- Dengue fever outbreaks
- 2024 dengue epidemic in Argentina
- 2023 dengue outbreak in Jamaica
- 2019–2020 dengue fever epidemic
- 2009 Bolivian dengue fever epidemic
