= Dengue fever (disambiguation) =

Dengue fever is an endemic viral infectious disease.

Dengue fever may also refer to:

- Dengue virus, the virus that causes dengue fever
- Dengue Fever (band)

== See also ==
- Dengue fever outbreaks
