= Newfoundland Diagnostics =

Health-testing company in London, England

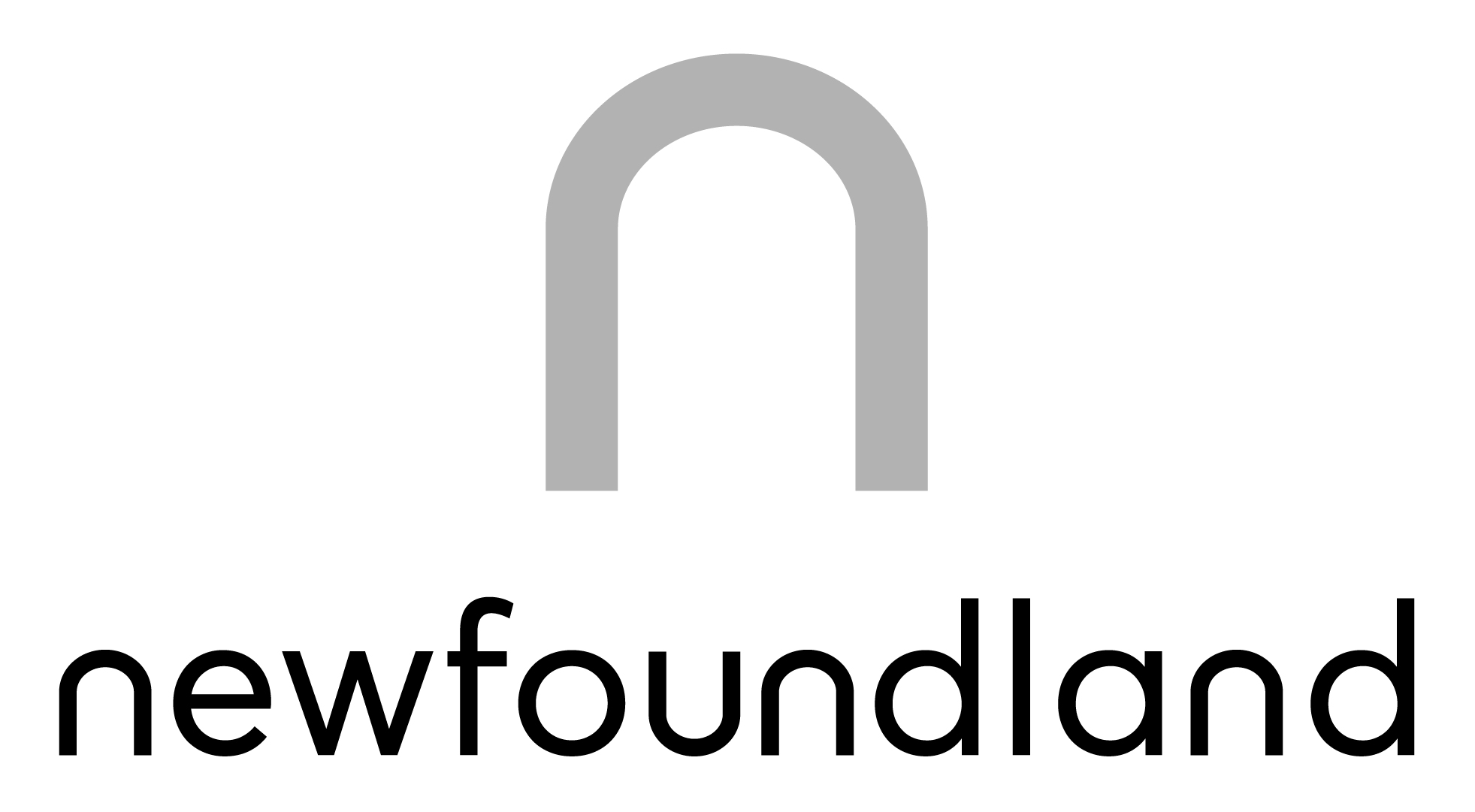

Newfoundland Diagnostics is a multinational health-testing company headquartered in London, United Kingdom. The company specializes in the development and distribution of diagnostic health tests, both for self-use and professional applications, offering such products available in major retailers for the first time in the United Kingdom.

== History ==
Newfoundland Diagnostics was founded in 2020, focusing initially on the distribution of COVID-19 rapid antigen tests. It served as a distributor for Acon Biotech's Flowflex test during the COVID-19 pandemic, becoming a leading player in this field in the United Kingdom, with revenue of over £100m in its first two years of trading.

The company was instrumental in offering diagnostic kits for various medical conditions, such as thyroid function, bowel health, menopause, kidney health, and HIV in a major retailer, notably for the first time in the United Kingdom, and pharmacies across the country.

== HIV rapid testing ==
In June 2023, Newfoundland Diagnostics entered into an exclusive supply agreement with Atomo Diagnostics (ASX: AT1), for the distribution of rapid self-test HIV kits at retailers in the United Kingdom and Europe. This gained notoriety as the world's first commercially available, at-home HIV test, which was sold in major retailers, such as Tesco.

== Recent developments ==
In October 2023, the company responded to the anticipated increase in Strep A cases following the 2022–2023 United Kingdom group A streptococcus outbreak by launching Strep A tests in Tesco stores and pharmacies across the United Kingdom. The company aims to provide enough tests to cover 90% of the United Kingdom's at-home testing market. In May 2024, the company featured within The E2E International 100 track 2024, in association with The Independent.

== Market presence and competitive landscape ==
As of 2023, Newfoundland Diagnostics holds one of the largest market shares in the United Kingdom for at-home diagnostic tests. The company's networks extend into public health sectors, pharmaceutical industries, and retail channels across the United Kingdom and Europe. It has also begun to make inroads into the European self-test diagnostic market. In 2024, Newfoundland appointed Hilary Jones (doctor) to an advisory role.
