= 2024 dengue epidemic in Argentina =

Epidemic outbreak in Argentina

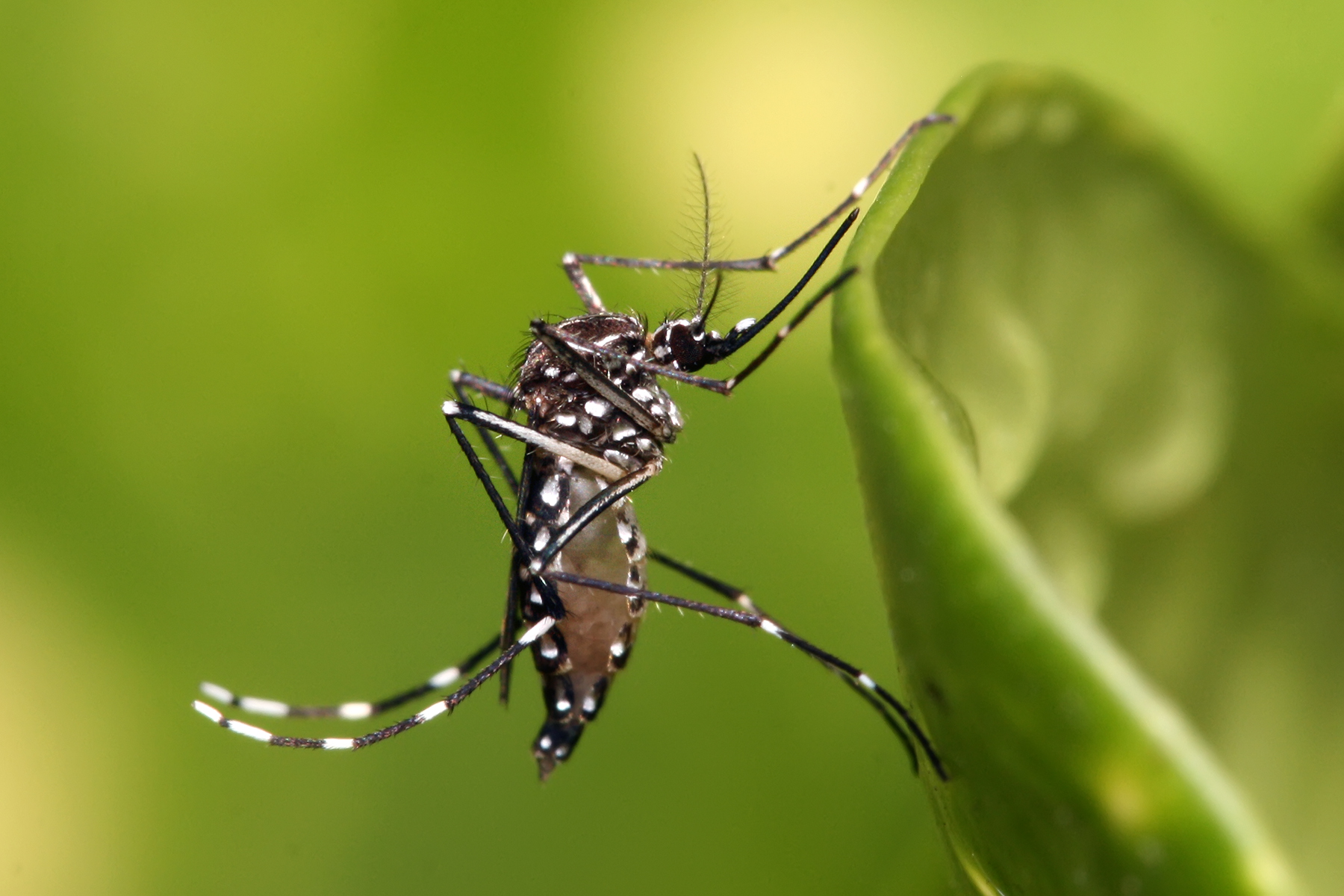
- Aedes aegypti
- Disease: Dengue virus
- Location: Argentina
- Date: 2024
- Type: Virus
- Confirmed cases: 333,084
- Deaths: 238

The 2024 dengue epidemic in Argentina was an outbreak of this disease, transmitted by the Aedes aegypti mosquito. It is considered to date as the largest dengue outbreak in Argentine history.

Epidemic outbreaks have been attributed to climate change and the mobility of people between neighbouring countries. From epidemiological week 1 to 13 of 2024, 215,885 cases have been reported, with a fatality rate of 0.07%. Although the tetravalent vaccine TAK-003 has been approved, its accessibility is limited by its high cost. The shortage of medical supplies and diagnostic reagents has caused a crisis in some health centres, while public policies, particularly in relation to the non-inclusion of the vaccine in the mandatory schedule and lack of allocation of funds for awareness campaigns, have generated controversy. On May 9, 2024, the Argentine Government announced that it will offer the dengue vaccine, but only limited to endemic areas with the highest prevalence of cases.

Dengue has spread more in the provinces of northern Argentina than in southern Argentina. This is due to Patagonia having a colder climate than northern regions.

By April 2024, the cases across the Americas was over 5 million people. By 10 June 2024, Argentina had reported over 500,000 cases.

== Background ==
The current season is distinguished by being the most significant in terms of exponential magnitude. In addition, it stands out for the persistence of cases in every week so far. The peak was reached in epidemiological week 11 of 2024, with a historical record of 33,866 cases, marking the maximum number of cases reported in a single week to date.

== Causes ==
The process of climate change has produced abundant rains and high temperatures, (a phenomenon called tropicalization) favouring the reproduction of the mosquito that transmits the dengue virus, advancing the epidemic this year by several weeks compared to previous seasons, which historically, Infection peaks tended to occur between March and April, suggesting a continued increase in cases. Precipitation provides more places for females to lay their eggs, while elevated temperatures allow mosquitoes to complete their maturation cycle and disperse the virus. Shortages of insect repellent have been reported.

Dr. Ricardo Gurtler, researcher at the Institute of Ecology, Genetics and Evolution of Buenos Aires, argues that the increase in dengue cases in Argentina is not only due to the situation in Brazil, where the incidence of the disease is high and has occurred a movement of the virus to other regions, but also to the intense exchange that Argentina has with neighbouring countries such as Paraguay and Bolivia. These countries have experienced epidemic outbreaks of dengue during the year, which could have contributed to the increase in cases in Argentina due to the mobility of people and the spread of the virus across borders.

It is also important to note that some areas of the country experienced a significant increase in precipitation due to the El Niño phenomenon. This contributed to excess water stagnation compared to normal levels. In addition, mosquitoes have developed resistance to lower temperatures, extending to latitudes further south than usual.

In a complementary sense, the absence of a visible and massive prevention campaign by public communication (directly related to the decision of the national government not to invest in dissemination) negatively affected, thus not allowing the population to be alerted to carry out actions that mitigate and combat the development of this epidemic.

Furthermore, the Argentine Government did not implement the vaccine on schedule. This situation was aggravated by the lack of price control after the dismantling of regulatory areas by the new government of Javier Milei.

== Epidemiology ==
=== Epidemiological context ===
The dengue outbreak, as well as other arboviruses, is analysed by the Ministry of Health in the context of the "epidemiological season", which in this case is in the period 2023/2024, which covers from epidemiological week 31 of the year 2023. until epidemiological week 30 of the year 2024, in which a total of 232,996 cases of dengue have been registered in Argentina. Of these, 215,885 cases have been specifically recorded from the beginning of the year 2024 to epidemiological week 13. Of these cases, 90% are considered indigenous, 7% are in the investigation phase and 3% are imported. Unofficial data indicate an approximate figure of 1,000,000 cases.

As for the accumulated incidence so far throughout the country, it stands at 495 cases per one hundred thousand people.

During this period, 512 cases have been classified as severe dengue, representing 0.2% of total cases. In addition, 161 dengue-related deaths have been recorded, which represents a fatality rate of 0.069%.

It is important to highlight that a persistence of cases is observed throughout the entire period analysed, as well as an advance in the seasonal increase starting from epidemiological week 40, with an acceleration from epidemiological week 50 and an even greater one from EW6. to the present.

Although there are cases of dengue and notifications investigated in all provinces of Argentina, there are currently 19 jurisdictions distributed in the five regions of the country, where the presence of the dengue virus with indigenous viral circulation has been confirmed. These areas include all provinces in the NOA, Northeast Argentina, Cuyo and Central regions, as well as the province of La Pampa in the Southern region. On the other hand, no indigenous viral circulation has been detected in the provinces of Chubut, Neuquén, Río Negro, Santa Cruz and Tierra del Fuego.

=== Circulation of serotypes ===
Three serotypes of dengue have been detected circulating in the country: DEN-1, DEN-2 and DEN-3, with a predominance of DEN-2 followed by DEN-1. In recent epidemiological weeks, 126 cases of coinfection of serotypes DEN-1 and DEN-2 were identified, mainly in the Central and NEA regions. These coinfections have not been associated with deceased cases.

=== Age groups ===
Although dengue cases have been reported in all age groups, a higher cumulative incidence stands out between 15 and 64 years of age compared to the general population, which has a cumulative incidence of 321.5 cases per one hundred thousand inhabitants. This incidence decreases at the ends of life. A minimum cumulative incidence is recorded in children under 4 years of age, with 77 cases per 100,000 inhabitants, while the maximum is observed between 25 and 29 years of age, with 423 cases per 100,000 inhabitants.

=== Severe dengue ===
During the period between epidemiological week 31 of 2023 and epidemiological week 13 of 2024, a total of 512 cases classified as severe dengue have been registered in the National Health Surveillance System (SNVS) in 18 jurisdictions, with 161 deceased cases reported in 16 jurisdictions. Of these deaths, 151 cases correspond to the year 2024.

The Central region contributes the highest number of cases of severe dengue, followed by the NEA region. The fatality rate at the country level so far is 0.07%. The serotype involved has been determined in 57 of the cases, with 40 cases of the DEN-2 serotype and 17 cases of the DEN-1 serotype.

There are no discrepancies in the proportion of deaths according to their sex, with a balance between the records of people of legal female and male sex, both representing 50%. The median age of the deceased was 49 years, with a variation ranging from less than 1 year to 91 years. Deaths occurred in all age groups, with those over 80 years of age being the most affected, followed by the groups of 70 to 79, 60 to 69 and 30 to 39 years. However, the 30 to 39-year-old group recorded the highest number of cases overall.

Comorbidities were recorded in 61 deceased cases, the most common being diabetes, heart disease, obesity, chronic neurological disease and chronic kidney failure. So far, data on pre-existing comorbidities are not available in the remaining 62% of deceased cases.

==== Symptom evolution ====
Although most cases are usually asymptomatic, severe dengue can cause death. The warning symptoms of severe dengue usually appear between 24 and 48 hours after the fever has disappeared. If a person experiences abdominal pain, vomiting (at least three times in a 24-hour period), bleeding from the nose or gums, and/or feeling fatigued, agitated, or irritable, it is crucial to seek medical attention immediately. Severe cases affect the blood vessels and begin with a mild fever, eye pain, discomfort and pain in the joints and muscles, and possibly skin rashes. Subsequently, serious bleeding may occur in the stomach, intestines and nose. The most extreme form can lead to severe bleeding, shock, or damage to vital organs such as myocarditis, acute inflammation of the brain or hepatitis, and ultimately death.

Among the deceased cases with complete clinical information, the most frequent signs and symptoms were fever, headache, myalgias and arthralgias, diarrhoea and abdominal pain. Until week 12 in children under 16 years of age, 72% of cases presented some gastrointestinal manifestation, while until week 13 in children under 15 years of age, 67% presented some gastrointestinal manifestation.

=== Second infection ===
The second dengue virus infection can be fatal, especially if the infected person develops severe dengue. The World Health Organization (WHO) has noted that having a previous infection with the dengue virus significantly increases the risk of developing severe dengue. This risk increases considerably even further if the second infection is caused by a different serotype of the virus.

Groups with risk factors for developing severe dengue include children under one year of age, pregnant women, adults over 65 years of age, and people with underlying medical conditions (comorbidities) that may compromise their immune system or their ability to fight the infection. These groups are especially vulnerable and should take additional measures to prevent a second dengue virus infection and seek urgent medical attention if they develop symptoms of the disease.

=== Treatment ===
Dengue infection, being of viral origin, lacks a specific treatment, focusing rather on relieving symptoms and managing its possible complications. For this, paracetamol is the recommended medication as an antipyretic and analgesic, while the use of NSAIDs such as ibuprofen, aspirin or naproxen is discouraged due to their potential to worsen the situation by intervening in platelet function. Since dengue causes fatigue and body aches, rest is essential, accompanied by frequent baths to maintain body temperature. In addition, constant hydration is recommended, drinking at least one and a half litres of water a day to prevent dehydration and support recovery.

==== Vaccination ====
In April 2023, the National Administration of Drugs, Food and Medical Technology (ANMAT) gave the green light to the use of the tetravalent vaccine TAK-003 known as Qdenga, developed by the Japanese laboratory Takeda Pharmaceutical Company, making it the only vaccine approved to date. to combat dengue in Argentina.

This vaccine is based on the DENV-2 virus, to which DNA from the other three serotypes is incorporated. This combination allows protection against the four known types of dengue. The vaccination schedule consists of two doses, administered with an interval of three months between each one.

It is available at a cost of 70,000 pesos (equivalent to $70 in the parallel market), which is inaccessible for many, considering the minimum wage of $200. The Pan American Health Organization (PAHO) recommends its application for those who have already suffered a first infection.

The National Immunization Commission (CoNaIn) has suggested to the Government that it proceed with the application of a "specific vaccination strategy", focused on particular areas or priority groups. Finally, the Government incorporated it into the vaccination calendar on May 10.

== Public policies ==
Although the Ministry of Health usually disseminates information about dengue through different channels such as social networks and its official website, the government led by Javier Milei has ruled out the allocation of official advertising funds used to raise awareness about this disease in the media. massive, unless an "emergency" arises, and that furthermore "it is the fault of Kirchnerism . " while Adorni's hypothesis was rejected by Milei's digital strategist, Fernando Cerimedo, who targeted the Microsoft founder directly, blaming Bill Gates for dengue, a position assumed by some members of the cabinet. Manuel Adorni, presidential spokesperson, mentioned that the dengue epidemic is not considered a priority for the government nor necessary to reactivate government advertising, that the Executive does not see it as necessary to include the dengue vaccine in the mandatory vaccination schedule, unlike Brazil, which took this measure in February, and argued this position by pointing out that "the effectiveness is not proven". The vaccine was finally announced in early May.

In response to the dengue outbreak, two national deputies from Santa Fe, one of the most affected provinces, presented a bill to establish prevention measures against the spread of the disease and to include the dengue vaccine in the mandatory vaccination schedule.

Health minister Mario Russo declared regarding the epidemic that the vaccine available for it "is not useful, it is not effective, to mitigate an outbreak" and relativized the lack of repellents, a situation which he summarized as a problem between supply and demand.

=== Imports ===
In response to the lack of supplies, on April 4 the Argentine government decided to open imports of insect repellents in all forms without intervention from the National Administration of Drugs, Food and Medical Technology. These special imports were exempted from the collection of Value Added Tax (21%) and income tax withholding (6%). The measures were made official in the Official Gazette on April 8, 2024, the same day that the first shipment arrived with 22 thousand units of repellent from Mexico. However, since it was a donation, the repellents were not sold commercially, but rather will be delivered to Caritas and other charitable organizations for delivery directly to vulnerable groups. A second import that came from Poland on April 9 which was used for general supplying of the shelves of supermarkets and pharmacies.

== Health impact ==
In response to the increase in dengue cases, several public hospitals have implemented special protocols for patient care. In some provinces, non-urgent surgeries have been rescheduled to free up beds and guarantee availability for patients affected by this disease. The guards at some health centres, already required previously, have been overwhelmed by the growing demand of patients with dengue symptoms. In some cases even receiving medical attention in the waiting rooms.

At the Hospital General de Agudos Bernardino Rivadavia in the city of Buenos Aires, the influx of patients has been such that sometimes the waiting line has come to surround the block. Some people with high fever, eye pain, or gastrointestinal upset have had to wait sitting on the floor or standing due to lack of space in waiting areas.

== Procurement issues ==
In the midst of a crisis due to the massive outbreak of dengue, the American multinational company SC Johnson & Son, owner of brands such as OFF!, "Fuyí" and "Raid" in Argentina, became the centre of criticism due to abusive practices derived from its dominant position in the mosquito repellent market. Consumers complain about product shortages and exorbitant prices that vary significantly between different stores.

While the company argues that they are increasing production to meet the growing demand, consumers maintain that the exorbitant prices, which reach up to ten times the original value, have no economic justification and represent a flagrant abuse towards the population that seeks protect your health. The main ingredient in these repellents, N, N-diethyl-meta-toluamide (DEET), developed by the United States Department of Agriculture in 1946 and released for public use four years later, remains crucial in the fight against mosquitoes that transmit diseases such as dengue.

=== Reagents and medical supplies ===
The lack of supplies and reagents to diagnose dengue is generating a crisis in Argentina's health system. High demand for these items, exacerbated by the historic outbreak of the disease, has caused shortages in public and private hospitals across the country. Suppliers, mostly located in Buenos Aires, face difficulties in distributing reagents, which has resulted in delays in their delivery and the inability to perform effective diagnostic tests. This situation is aggravated by the increase in prices of medical supplies, which makes their acquisition by health institutions even more difficult.

The lack of reagents is having serious consequences on the diagnosis and treatment of dengue, as many patients are forced to wait long periods for test results, delaying appropriate care. Additionally, these shortages compromise hospitals' ability to effectively control the outbreak, increasing the risk of disease spread. The situation is especially worrying in provinces such as Córdoba and Salta, where high numbers of cases have been recorded and health institutions are struggling to obtain the necessary supplies.

== Political repercussions ==
In the province of Buenos Aires, Governor Axel Kicillof criticized President Javier Milei, accusing him of completely ignoring the "health crisis." Using a newspaper article that suggests the possibility of the president transferring the dengue problem to the provinces, Kicillof questioned his response to the situation saying:

A president who is inspired by a 'liberal libertarian', 'anarcho-capitalist', '19th century Austrian School' ideology or creed that has never been applied anywhere, 'decides' to disappear completely in the face of the dengue epidemic. grave of history.

The Minister of Health of the province of Buenos Aires, Nicolás Kreplak joined the accusations against the national government, pointing out the lack of a strategic plan to address dengue:

A national government that begins its functions on December 10, and that knows that there will be dengue, cannot take office without a strategic plan. And here there has not been, nor is there, a plan against dengue.

== See also ==
- Dengue fever outbreaks
- 2024 dengue outbreak in Latin America and the Caribbean
- 2009 Bolivian dengue fever epidemic
