= Panacea Biotec =

Indian pharmaceutical company

- Type: Public
- Traded as: NSE: PANACEABIO; BSE: 531349
- Industry: Pharmaceutical
- Founded: 1984
- Headquarters: New Delhi, India
- Key people: Soshil Kumar Jain (Executive Chairman of the Board); Rajesh Jain (Managing Director); Sandeep Jain (Joint Managing Director)
- Products: Pharmaceuticals, generic drugs, vaccine
- Website: www.panaceabiotec.com

Panacea Biotec is a global generic and specialty pharmaceutical and vaccine maker. It has principal offices in New Delhi, Mumbai, and Lalru (near Chandigarh). It has business interests in research, development, manufacturing and marketing of pharmaceutical formulations, vaccines, biosimilars, and natural products.

== History ==
Panacea Drugs was set up in the year 1984 and got listed in 1995 as Panacea Biotec Ltd. The company has grown organically to become one of the largest vaccine manufacturers in India.

In August 2011, several of its hepatitis vaccines were removed from the list of prequalified vaccines by the World Health Organization because of quality management issues, but the issues were resolved by early 2012. Its leading product, EasyFive-TT, regained WHO PQ in September 2013.

As of July 2020, the company is also developing a vaccine for SARS-COV-2 using a Whole inactivated Virus approach. It got an investment in April 2020 from a US based pharma firm.

In May 2021, Panacea Biotec tied up with Russian Direct Investment Fund (RDIF, Russia’s sovereign wealth fund) to produce 100 million doses of Sputnik V COVID-19 vaccine annually in India.

== Products ==
Panacea Biotec is one of the largest vaccine manufacturers and pharmaceutical companies in India. Panacea Biotec is focused on research in Vaccines, Pharmaceuticals, Biosimilars, and Nutraceuticals. It is one of the three largest biotechnology companies in India. The company develops and produces medicines for a wide range of medical disciplines, including oncology, organ transplant, immunology and pain management, gastroenterology, vaccines, and diabetology/endocrinology.

=== Transplant ===
Panacea Biotec has many drugs for kidney and liver transplant such as Tacrolimus (marketed as PanGraf), Mycophenolic acid (Mycept), mycophenolate sodium (Mycept S), etc. It also markets generic forms of Tacrolimus in the United States, Germany, among many other developing countries.

=== Nephrology ===
Panacea Biotec has a focused presence in nephrology therapy in the highly specialized organ transplantation and dialysis management segments. It offers a range of pre-transplant and post-transplant therapies that include drugs such as lanthanum carbonate, sevelamer, and valganciclovir in conventional and novel drug delivery systems.

=== Gastroenterology and orthopaedic ===
Panacea Biotec has many products for treatment of arthritis, haemorrhoids, acid reflux, and other gastrointestinal problems. Its most prominent product is Sitcom, a euphorbia prostata extract that helps different grades of haemorrhoids. It also markets a once-a-day combination of regular and controlled-release Aceclofenac (generic to Clanza CR) under the brand name Willgo CR.

=== Oncology ===
Panacea Biotec has many brands marketed in India for the 'affordable' treatment for cancer, viz, breast cancer, brain tumor, ovarian cancer, pancreatic cancer, prostate cancer and colorectal cancer. One of its most prominent brand in this segment is, PacliAll, which is a generic version of Abraxane Protein-bound paclitaxel. The company has plans to market the product in the US as per the patent settlement.

=== Diabetes ===
The company has extensively focused on its diabetic portfolio with formulations such as gliclazide, metformin, and glimepiride that are marketed in India and other developing markets under the brand names Glizid, Glizid M, Glizid MR, Betaglim, and Metlong. It is one of the largest diabetic companies in its represented market.

== Vaccines ==
Panacea Biotec markets many generic and novel vaccines in India and many global markets. Some of its vaccines are Pre-qualified by the WHO.

The listing below is for named vaccines; Panacea Biotec produces many vaccines which do not bear trade names.

- Polio vaccines
- Haemophilus influenzae type b vaccines
- Diphtheria, tetanus and polio combined vaccines
- DPT, haemophilus combined vaccines
- DPT, polio combined vaccines
- DPT, haemophilus, polio combined vaccines
- DPT, haemophilus, polio, hepatitis B combined vaccines
- Dengue vaccines
- Influenza vaccines
- Tetanus vaccines
- Pneumococcal vaccine

== Notable achievements ==
- In 1998, Panacea Biotec was awarded its first product patent for Nimulid transgel.
- In 2005, Panacea Biotec was the first to launch a fully-liquid Pentavalent vaccine (DTwP-HepB-Hib), EasyFive in India and it was subsequently, pre-qualified by the WHO for introduction in various countries designated by the GAVI vaccination alliance.
- In 2006, collaboration with the Netherlands Vaccine Institute (the Nederlands Vaccin Instituut (NVI)) for manufacture and marketing of a finished inactivated polio Vaccine (IPV) and a number of IPV-based combination vaccines in India and across the globe
- In 2008, WHO prequalification for fully liquid innovative combination pentavalent vaccine, EasyFive against five deadly infectious diseases (DTwP+ Hep B+ Hib) of early childhood
- In 2011, Panacea Biotec was the first to launch PacliAll, the world's first generic to Abraxane Protein-bound paclitaxel in India.
- In 2017, Panacea Biotec was the first to launch a fully-liquid Hexavalent vaccine (DTwP-HepB-Hib-IPV), EasySix in India.

== Hospital venture ==
Panacea Biotec sold its near-completed hospital in Delhi NCR to Narayana Hrudayalaya in April 2017 for 180 crores; effectively, exiting the hospital business.
