= List of Prequalified Vaccines =

The List of Prequalified Vaccines, published by the World Health Organization, lists vaccines that are found to be safe, effective and of good quality, after undergoing investigation of relevant data, testing and examination of their production sites.

== High priority vaccines eligible for WHO prequalification (2018-2020) ==
High priority 2018-2020
Vaccine	Detail	Image
DTaP and DTaP combination containing inactivated polio vaccine (IPV) or hepatitis B		
Dengue vaccine		
HPV vaccine		
Malaria vaccine		
MMR vaccine		
Pneumococcal conjugate vaccine		
polio (inactivated) (IPV)		
Polio vaccine		
Rabies vaccine		
Rotavirus vaccine		
Typhoid vaccine		
Yellow fever vaccine		
