= Pink eye outbreak in Pakistan =

2023 disease outbreak in Pakistan

- Disease: Conjunctivitis (pink eye)
- Location: Pakistan
- First outbreak: Karachi
- Arrival date: September 2023
- Confirmed cases: 86,133 in Punjab (as of September 2023)

In September 2023, there was an occurrence of conjunctivitis, commonly referred to as pink eye, in multiple cities across Pakistan. The outbreak initially began in Karachi and subsequently extended to Lahore, eventually reaching Rawalpindi, Islamabad and Khyber Pakhtunkhwa.

== Cases reported ==
As of September 2023, Punjab had reported a total of 86,133 cases of pink eye. Within a 24-hour span, Lahore saw an additional 85 new cases, at a time when the city's air quality had worsened due to reduced rainfall that year. The total number of cases had doubled since the previous month of August.

== Response from health authorities ==
Amid the escalating cases, the Primary and Secondary Healthcare Department in Punjab issued a public advisory. This advisory outlined safety protocols, urging individuals to utilize hand sanitizer, refrain from touching their eyes without proper hand hygiene, and avoid using items that had come into contact with infected individuals.

== Impact on schools ==
In response to the increasing case numbers, Mohsin Raza Naqvi, the interim Chief Minister of Punjab, declared a one-day holiday for all government schools. Subsequently, the Punjab government extended this measure by directing both government and private schools to remain closed from Thursday through Sunday, aiming to curb the spread of the infection.

== Symptoms and treatment ==
Pink eye, or conjunctivitis, manifests through symptoms like redness, inflammation, painful eyes, and increased tearing. This viral disease spreads through respiratory droplets from coughing, sneezing, and hand-to-eye contact. Treatment typically involves the use of eye drops, ointments, oral medication, and gentle water flushes to alleviate symptoms and promote recovery.
