= 2024 Russian botulism outbreak =

Foodborne illness outbreak in Russian cities

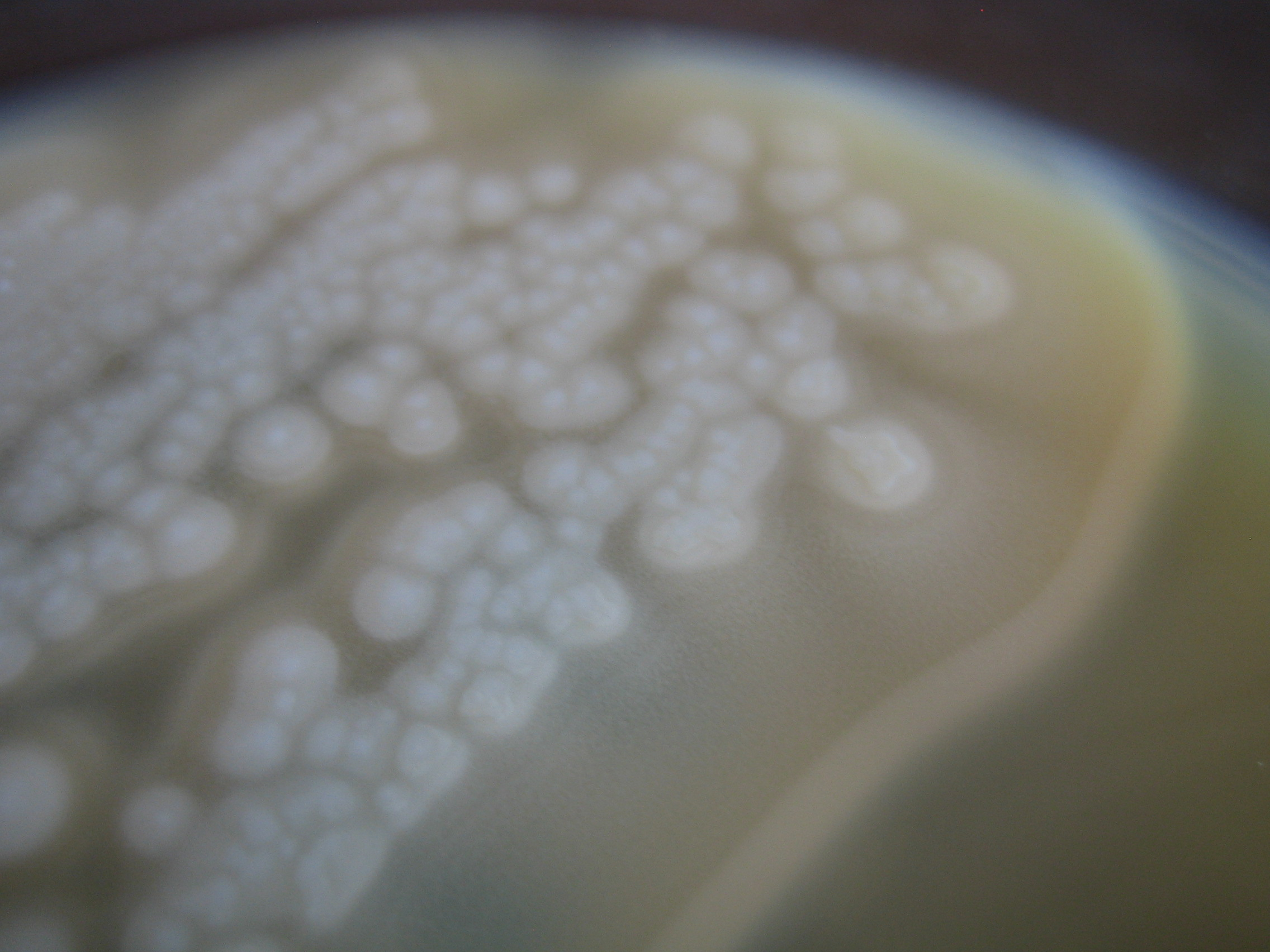
- Clostridium botulinum in a petri dish
- Disease: Botulism
- Pathogen: Clostridium botulinum
- Location: Russia
- Type: Theorized to be ready-to-eat salads spread by food delivery
- Confirmed cases: 369
- Severe cases: 76+
- Critical cases: 30+
- Deaths: 2
- Territories: Moscow, Nizhny Novgorod, Kazan, Kostroma

In June 2024, at least 369 people in Russia were poisoned with botulism, resulting in one fatality and hundreds more hospitalized in serious condition and 38 people having to go to the intensive care unit. The Russian health ministry linked many of the cases of botulism to two brands of ready-to-eat salads containing canned beans, one of which was sold by food delivery service Kukhnya Na Rayone. As a result, the Rospotrebnadzor national food health agency and local health agencies issued a nation-wide recall of the salads, which Kukhnya Na Rayone participated in.

== Outbreak ==
As of 24 June 2024, a total of 369 people had been hospitalized with botulism symptoms, with at least 38 people placed on ventilators. At least 121 people in Moscow were diagnosed with botulism after going to their practitioner for help, 55 of the affected were in serious condition, and 30 people needed to be moved to the intensive care unit. In the outlying Moscow metropolitan area, 20 people were hospitalized with twelve in serious condition. Fourteen people were diagnosed with botulism in Nizhny Novgorod with nine of them in serious condition, and fourteen people in Kazan needed to be hospitalized due to symptoms of botulism.

On 24 June 2024, authorities reported that a 21-year old man who had obtained a salad in Nizhny Novgorod died after being hospitalised in Kostroma for botulism.

The second case of botulism infection with a fatal outcome occurred with a 24-year-old resident of the city of Dzerzhinsk, Russia, Nizhny Novgorod Oblast. He, like the others, was poisoned by a lobio salad with canned beans. The young man had a chronic disease that was sharply aggravated by botulism - this led to death.

== Investigation ==
Kukhnya Na Rayone, a Russian food delivery service based in Moscow, had one two brands of recalled salads on their menu, which contained canned beans. Shortly after early cases were announced, Kukhnya Na Rayone posted an online statement stating that it would recall the salad and inspect other food options they hosted on their menu to avoid further botulism poisoning cases.

The Moscow prosecutor's office began a criminal investigation to determine if Kukhnya Na Rayone breached consumer safety standards, temporarily shutting down operations of the company. Moscow Deputy Mayor Anastasia Rakova stated that due to prompt treatment of the symptoms with anti-toxins in hospitals, there was no longer any "threat to the lives" of the patients treated in Moscow.

Three people were detained by Russian authorities: Kukhnya Na Rayone director Anton Lozin; its quality department head, Yelena Mashkova, and Savon-K director Vladimir Shin from the company that made the canned beans. Authorities claimed that the food companies involved "violated multiple sanitary and epidemiological standards" which included the failure of the companies to submit required laboratory test reports for food quality, not effectively regulating production control, and facilitating the illegal immigration of Uzbek citizens.
