= 2023 Mexico meningitis outbreak =

Fungal meningitis outbreak in Mexico

2023 Mexico Meningitis outbreak
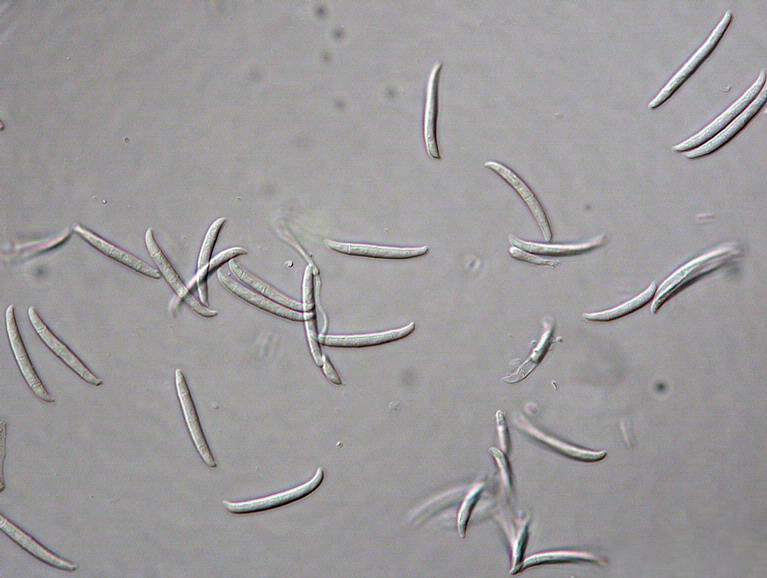
- Fusarium solani species of fungal meningitis
- Disease: Fungal meningitis
- Location: Matamoros, Tamaulipas
- Dates: 8 May 2023-present
- Confirmed cases: 9
- Suspected cases^{‡}: 15
- Deaths: 7
- ^{‡}Suspected cases have not been confirmed by laboratory tests as being due to this strain, although some other strains may have been ruled out.

In 2023, a fungal meningitis outbreak linked to two cosmetic surgery clinics in Matamoros, Mexico resulted in the death of seven women, one in Mexico and six in the United States.

== History ==
On May 8, 2023, the Emerging Infections Network system brought two unusual meningitis cases to the attention of the United States Centers for Disease Control and Prevention (CDC). The agency issued a level 2 travel health notice on May 16 and a Health Alert Notice the subsequent day.

By late May 2023, the CDC was monitoring about 400 people, 11 of whom had probable and 14 of whom had suspected fungal meningitis. At that time, Texan women Shyanne Medrano (aged 31) and Lauren Robinson (aged 29) had died after receiving epidural anaesthesias at two cosmetic surgery clinics in Matamoros. Patients were predominantly U.S. citizens receiving breast augmentation, buttock augmentation or liposuction.

Both the River Side Surgical Center and Clinica K-3 were shut down by health authorities on May 13, 2023. The fusarium solani species of fungus appeared to be present at the clinics. Mexican president López Obrador attributed the outbreak to contaminated medication.

By June 7, there were 14 suspected cases, 10 probable cases and four deaths. The CDC were examining 179 people linked to the outbreak.

Mexican and U.S. health agencies urged the World Health Organization (WHO) to issue a warning about the outbreak. On June 1, 2023, the World Health Organization reported that the CDC had notified them of five confirmed cases, all women and noted 20 other suspected cases.

In June 2023, attempts to contact patients of the affected clinic were failing due to transcription errors, patients giving incorrect details, and patients being unable to afford the relevant meningitis tests. Some patients who attended Emergency Departments to seek testing were turned away due to a lack of symptoms, despite fungal meningitis sometimes being asymptomatic for over a week. By June 29, there were nine confirmed cases, and seven deaths, one in Mexico and six in the United States. The next day, there were 10 probable cases plus 15 suspected that cases, with 161 people under investigation.

The majority of suspected cases are younger American women in Texas.

== See also ==
- 2026 Kent meningitis outbreak
