= 2022 Tucumán legionellosis outbreak =

Disease outbreak in Argentina

- Disease: Legionellosis
- Pathogen: Legionella pneumophila
- Location: Argentina
- First reported: 20 August 2022
- Index case: San Miguel de Tucumán
- Confirmed cases: 22
- Deaths: 6

The 2022 Tucumán legionellosis outbreak refers to an epidemic that originated in San Miguel de Tucumán, Argentina. It was first identified on Saturday, 20 August 2022, when 7 people arrived at the Tucumán Hospital with fever, malaise, shortness of breath, and headache.

== History ==
The first six cases were five healthcare workers and one patient. These cases started showing symptoms between 18 and 22 August. All six of these cases were linked to a single private health facility.

The World Health Organization was notified on 29 August 2022, by the Ministry of Health of Argentina.

On 1 September, three more cases were found through active case finding, bringing the total number of cases to nine, with three deaths. The three new cases were all health workers from the same private health facility.

On 2 and 3 September, two more case were found, bringing the total number of cases to eleven. The median age of these eleven cases was 45, with seven male and four female cases. All eleven reported cases were transferred to intensive care units.

On 3 September, the Argentine Ministry of Health confirmed that the outbreak was caused by the bacterial infection legionella pneumophila, which can cause legionnaires' disease.Influenza, COVID-19, Coxiella, 12 respiratory viruses, hantavirus, histoplasma, Yersinia pestis, and leptospirosis were ruled out through laboratory testing.

On 4 September, eight more cases were reported, bringing the total number of cases to 19, with six deaths.

On 5 September, the Ministry of Public Health of Tucumán reported new inclusion criteria for the case definition of the outbreak. The new case definition included any health personnel, family, or patient who had been in or received surgery in this private health facility in the month of August, with compatible symptoms such as respiratory symptoms or fever, but not necessarily bilateral pneumonia.

On 6 September, the Ministry of Public Health reported a total of 22 cases and six deaths.

== Public health response ==
Legionell spp. was identified as the etiology of the outbreak through laboratory testing.

Several measures were implemented following this:

- Enhanced surveillance with active and passive case finding.
- Isolation of cases.
- Risk assessment.
- The suspension of healthcare activities in the private health facility that was linked to most cases.
- Environmental sampling to identify the source of contamination.
- Biological sampling and laboratory testing.
- Contact tracing and monitoring.
- Risk communication.
