= 2022–2023 United States P. aeruginosa outbreak in eye drops =

The 2022–2023 United States Pseudomonas aeruginosa outbreak began in May 2022, with the infection of several patients in California. The Centers for Disease Control and Prevention (CDC) became aware of a strain of Pseudomonas aeruginosa in artificial tears manufactured by EzriCare and Delsam Pharma in January 2023.

== History ==
Clinical samples from the CDC indicate that eye drops may have been contaminated as far back as May 2022 and until April 2023; the CDC is currently looking into samples as far back as January 2022. Food and Drug Administration (FDA) officials identified a plant in Tamil Nadu, India that manufactured the eye drops, finding that the plant used a "deficient manufacturing process" between December 2020 and April 2022. The CDC was notified of eye infections among four people at an ophthalmology clinic in California in late June 2022, and received notice of an outbreak at long-term care facilities in Connecticut in late July and Utah in August involving 21 and three people, respectively.

On February 2, 2023, the CDC advised people to stop using EzriCare Artificial Tears and said that the eye drops were contaminated. The P. aeruginosa strain had been found in 55 people across 12 states as of January 31, resulting in one death and vision loss in five people. A recall was ordered for EzriCare Artificial Tears, which later included Delsam Pharma's Artificial Tears. EzriCare and Delsam Pharma are both owned by Indian pharmaceutical company Global Pharma. EzriCare was informed of the outbreak on January 20, according to the company.

On March 1, Apotex recalled prescription eye drops, and on March 3, Pharmedica recalled eye drops that treat eye irritation. P. aeruginosa has not been associated in either of these products.

== Signs and symptoms ==
Symptoms may include discharge from the eyes, pain or redness in the eyes, blurry vision, and increased sensitivity to light. Respiratory or urinary tract infections may indicate the presence of P. aeruginosa.

== Cause ==
The outbreak is caused by a strain of Pseudomonas aeruginosa known as Verona Integron-mediated Metallo-β-lactamase (VIM) and Guiana-Extended Spectrum-β-Lactamase (GES)-producing carbapenem-resistant P. aeruginosa (VIM-GES-CRPA). The strain of P. aeruginosa may spread from person-to-person, as was first seen in a long-term care center in Connecticut. According to the CDC, VIM-GES-CRPA had not appeared in the United States until the outbreak. In comparison, P. aeruginosa is "pretty much everywhere" in India, according to Christian Medical College researcher Gagandeep Kang.

== Epidemiology ==
As of May 19, 2023, 81 cases across 18 states have been reported with four deaths. 14 people have experienced vision loss, while four have undergone enucleation.
