= 2024–2025 Kansas tuberculosis outbreak =

Disease outbreak in Kansas, United States

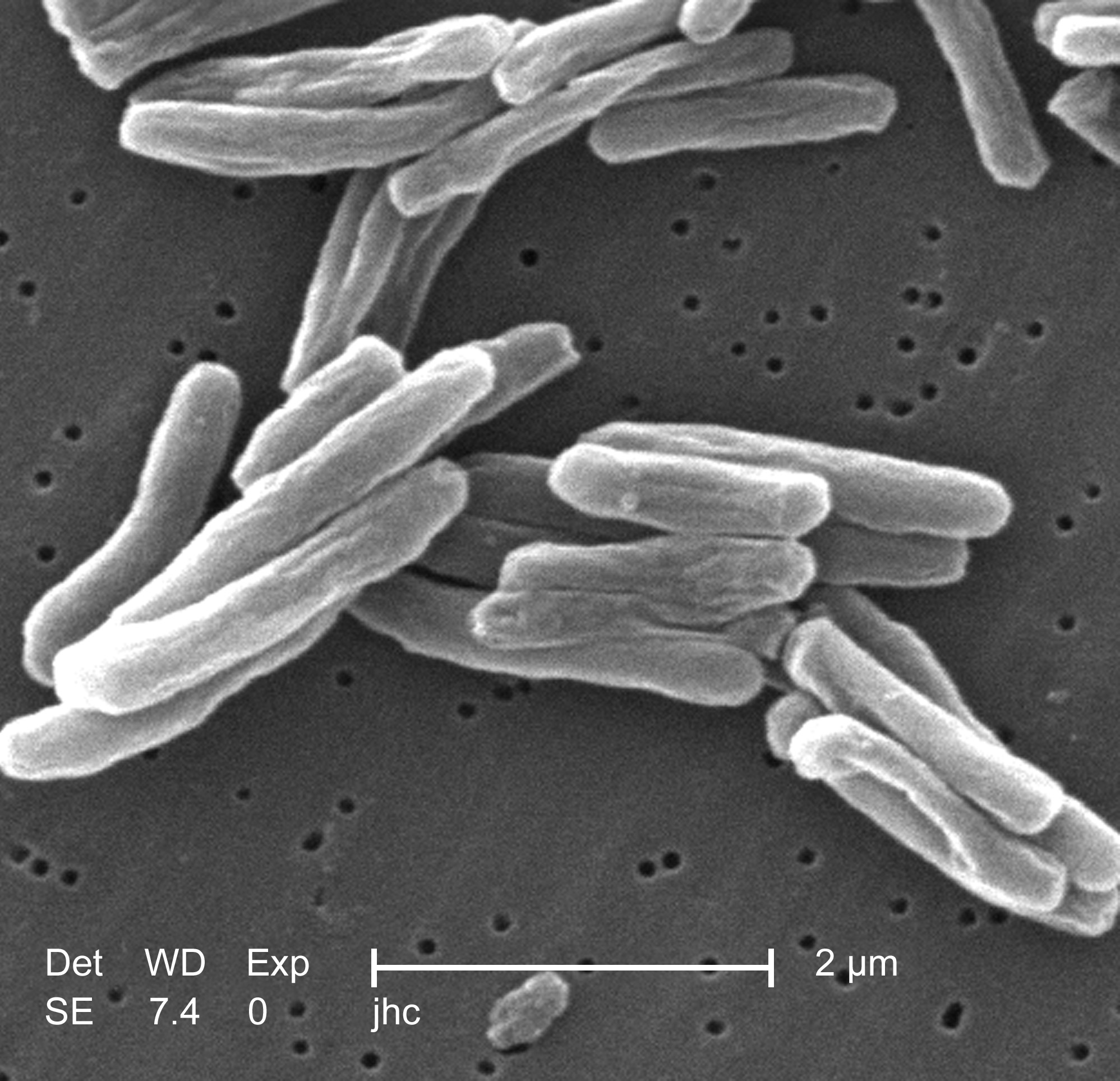
Mycobacterium tuberculosis, the bacteria which causes tuberculosis.

Starting in 2024, the U.S. state of Kansas experienced a sudden rise in cases of tuberculosis, with 68 active cases. 113 cases of tuberculosis were recorded in Kansas in 2024, compared to 51 in 2023. It is one of the largest tuberculosis outbreaks reported in the U.S. since surveillance for large outbreaks began in 2008.

The Kansas Department of Health and Environment has not publicly identified the source of the outbreak. On November 14, 2025, after all patients had completed treatment, the Kansas Department of Health and Environment declared the end of the outbreak.

== History ==
The first tuberculosis cases related to the outbreak were recorded in January 2024. Two deaths were linked to the outbreak in 2024. Containment efforts by local authorities began in summer 2024, with guidance from the CDC.

As of November 2025, 68 cases of active tuberculosis disease and 91 additional infections (in which an individual tests positive, but does not show symptoms or transmit the bacteria) were discovered in connection to the outbreak. 650 people were evaluated by public health agencies during the investigation.

No new cases of active tuberculosis disease were discovered in relation to the outbreak after April 2025. On November 14, 2025, after all patients had completed treatment, the Kansas Department of Health and Environment declared that the outbreak was over.

== Impact ==
Kansas state officials have said that most cases have been located in Wyandotte County and Johnson County.
