= 2021 South Sudan disease outbreak =

Disease outbreak in South Sudan

- Disease: Unknown
- Deaths: 97

On 14 December 2021, the World Health Organization launched an investigation into an unknown disease that has resulted in at least 89 deaths in Fangak, Jonglei State, South Sudan. Symptoms of the disease were said to be cough, diarrhea, fever, headache, chest pain, joint pain, loss of appetite, and body weakness. As of the last report of the disease, in late December 2021, 97 people had died of the disease, most of which were elderly or below the age of 14.

== History ==
In early December 2021, South Sudan's ministry of health reported dozens of deaths due to an unidentified illness. The reports came amidst severe flooding in the region and prompted the World Health Organization (WHO) to send rapid response team to collect samples of the disease. Initial samples tested negative for cholera.
