= 2023 Calgary E. coli outbreak =

Disease outbreak in Calgary, Canada

- Pathogen: Shigatoxigenic E. coli
- Source: Contaminated food
- Location: Calgary, Alberta, Canada
- Date: Sept. 5 – Oct. 31, 2023 (56 days)
- Confirmed cases: 356
- Severe cases: 23; 8 required dialysis
- Hospitalized cases: 39 (38 children, 1 adult)
- Deaths: 0

The 2023 Calgary E. coli outbreak first occurred in daycares in the Calgary area, in Alberta, Canada, and was the result of E. coli contamination from a kitchen facility. The outbreak was declared on September 5, 2023, and resulted in 356 confirmed cases and a further 90 suspected cases before it was declared over by the Alberta Health Services on October 31, 2023. No deaths were attributed to the outbreak.

== Outbreak ==
The outbreak was likely the result of meatloaf and vegan-meatloaf served at daycare centres on August 29, 2023. Initial cases of gastrointestinal illness were first identified between August 31, 2023 and September 3, 2023 at Calgary area hospitals. On September 5, 2023, Alberta Health Services declared an outbreak of E. coli for six locations operated by Fueling Brains and an additional five locations that were supplied by Fueling Brains. On September 11, 2023, mandatory testing was implemented for students and staff who attended five identified daycares.

The first official public address of the outbreak the provincial government was on September 12, 2023 where Alberta Health Services released an inspection reported dated September 5, 2023, showing that the kitchen likely responsible for the outbreak "lacked proper sanitization methods, had a pest infestation and food was transported without temperature control." In a letter addressed to physicians, Alberta Health Services identified the E. coli as a Shiga toxin producing Escherichia coli (STEC) on September 17, 2023.

On September 18, 2023 with 348 cases, officials expected that the number of cases had peaked.

On October 31, 2023, Alberta Health Services declared the outbreak over after 56 days, following the final release of all patients from the hospital. In total, 356 patients had been confirmed infected with E. coli. Thirty-two cases were identified as secondary cases, having most likely received the contamination from exposure to someone who had been exposed to the contaminated food. In total, 39 people were hospitalized (of those, 38 were children); 23 were diagnosed with severe outcome of hemolytic uremic syndrome and 8 required peritoneal dialysis. No deaths were attributed to the outbreak.

== Aftermath ==
On September 16, 2023 the provincial government announced a compassionate care fund of CA$2,000 for families affected by the outbreak.

Fueling Minds, the kitchen responsible for the source of the outbreak, was charged by the City of Calgary for operating without a business license. The kitchen was providing meal services to schools not operated by the organization, and therefore beyond the scope of their current business license. A proposed class-action lawsuit was filed against the company on behalf of those affected by the outbreak.
