= 2022–2023 United Kingdom group A streptococcus outbreak =

Ongoing disease outbreak in the UK

2022–2023 United Kingdom Lancefield group A streptococcus outbreak
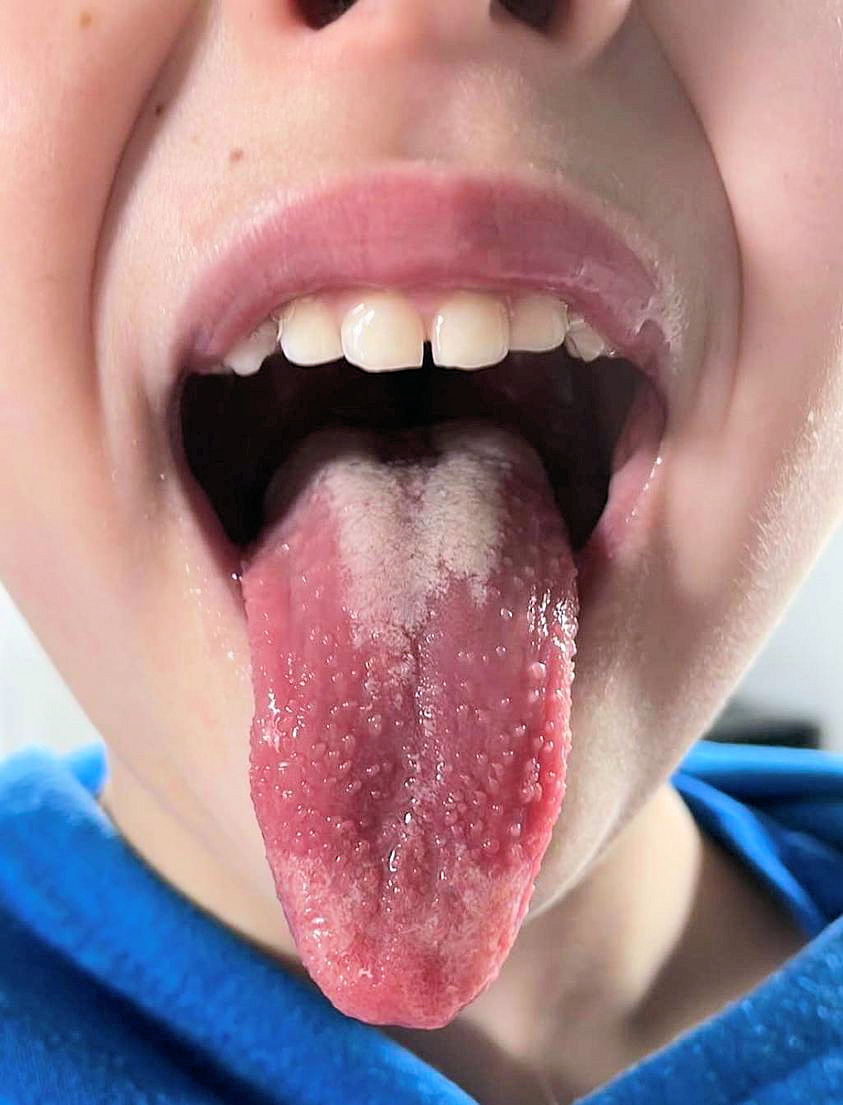
- The tongue of a child showing the signs of scarlet fever caused by Lancefield group A streptococci
- Disease: Group A streptococcal infection (iGAS); Scarlet fever
- Pathogen: Group A streptococcus
- Location: United Kingdom
- Date: 12 September 2022
- Confirmed cases: iGAS: 3,729; Scarlet fever: 58,972
- Deaths: 516
- Fatality rate: 13.7% (iGAS)

In late 2022, an ongoing disease outbreak caused by the bacterium Streptococcus pyogenes, a Lancefield group A streptococcus, began in the United Kingdom. It is often referred to as the Strep A outbreak in the media. These bacteria cause group A streptococcal infections (Strep A or iGAS) and scarlet fever. In the UK, 516 deaths from iGAS have been recorded, of which 61 were children, 52 in England, five in Wales, three in Scotland, and one in Northern Ireland.

There were 3,729 notifications of iGAS recorded in England between 12 September 2022 and 18 June 2023. Notifications of scarlet fever have also seen a large increase, with 58,972 infections reported in England during the same period. The UKHSA said that rate of iGAS cases were fluctuating at the upper end of the range expected for the time of year after the high levels seen during December 2022.

== Background ==
Group A streptococcal infections are diseases, including scarlet fever, which are caused by the bacterium Streptococcus pyogenes, a Lancefield group A streptococcus (GAS). In 2007 it was estimated that GAS infections cause over 500,000 deaths per year. On very rare occasions, GAS enter the bloodstream and cause an illness called invasive group A strep (iGAS) which is very serious, particularly in older, younger and more vulnerable groups.

In the United Kingdom, the UK Health Security Agency (UKHSA) has said that the last comparably high season was the 2017/18 season, where 355 deaths occurred from iGAS, 27 of which were children. During this season the UKHSA also received total of 30,768 reports of scarlet fever.

== Deaths ==
So far, 516 deaths have been recorded within 7 days of an iGAS infection, 61 of which were children. The other reported deaths are people over the age of at least 15. Usually, only one or two children under the age of 10 die from GAS infections during a typical winter.

The case fatality rate (CFR) for iGAS from 12 September to 18 June in England was 13.7%.

Country	Child deaths	Adult deaths	Total
England	52	439	491
Scotland	3	16	19
Wales	5	-	5
Northern Ireland	1	-	1
(United Kingdom) Total	61	455	516
As of 18 June 2023

== Cases ==
The UK Health Security Agency (UKHSA) said that an average of 2,861 (range 479 to 5,051) of scarlet fever were recorded during the same period over the past 5 years.

The following table shows the number of notifications of iGAS and scarlet fever published by data from the UKHSA from 12 September to 18 June.

Country	iGAS	Scarlet fever	Total
England	3,729	58,972	62,701
Scotland	-	-	-
Wales	-	-	-
Northern Ireland	-	-	-
(United Kingdom) Total	3,729	58,972	62,701
As of 18 June 2023

== Response ==
During a House of Commons debate on 7 December 2022, Prime Minister Rishi Sunak was accused of downplaying the outbreak after leader of the opposition Keir Starmer questioned him on his handling of the disease. Sunak stated that the infection 'has not become more lethal'.

A survey of 626 parents' attitudes towards Strep A revealed a range of misinformation narratives, with 32% thinking that COVID-19 vaccines and flu vaccines were partly responsible for an increase in Strep A infections. Furthermore, 49% were unsure as to whether there is a link between nasal flu vaccines and Strep A. It also found that 28% were sceptical about Strep A, believing that it is a disguise being used to cover up something else. Increasing migration and refugee numbers were blamed by 33% of respondents for the increase in infections.

== See also ==
- 2022-2023 United States group A streptococcus outbreak
- Streptococcal pharyngitis
