= Dengue fever outbreaks =

Disease outbreak

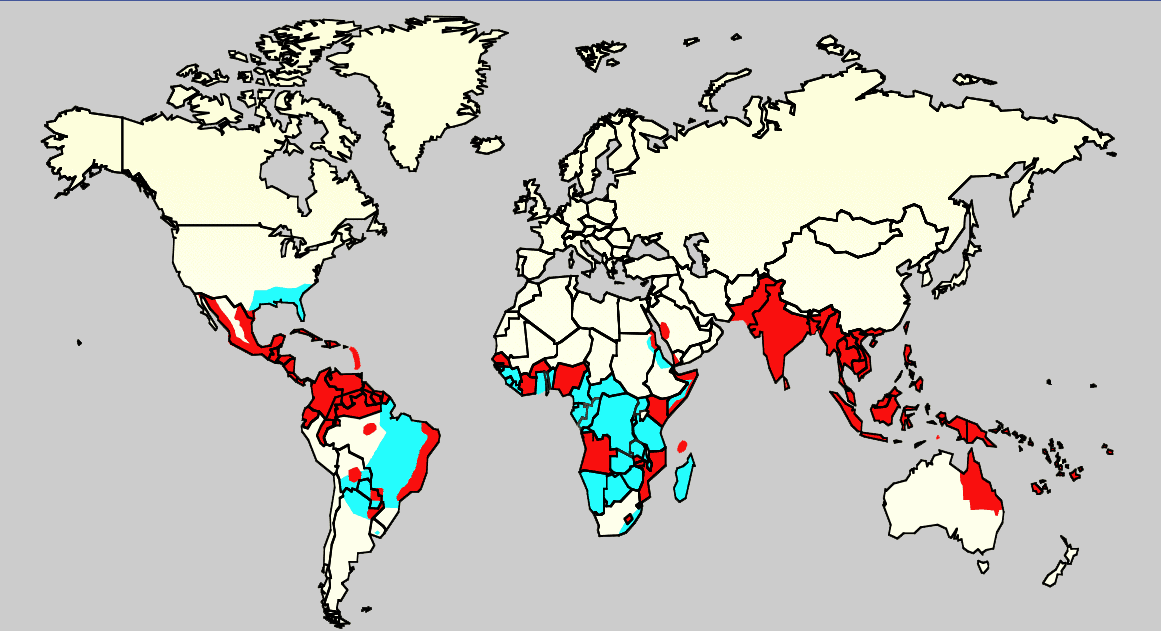
Worldwide dengue distribution, 2006. Red: Epidemic dengue. Blue: Aedes aegypti.

Disability-adjusted life year for dengue fever per million inhabitants in 2012. no data 0-0 1-1 1–45 47–87 92–141 143–330 346–356 367–440 496–37,325

As of 2010, dengue fever is believed to infect 50 to 100 million people worldwide a year with 1/2 million life-threatening infections. It dramatically increased in frequency between 1960 and 2010, by 30 fold. This increase is believed to be due to a combination of urbanization, population growth, increased international travel, and global warming. The geographical distribution is around the equator with 70% of the total 2.5 billion people living in endemic areas from Asia and the Pacific. Many of the infected people during outbreaks are not virally tested, therefore their infections may also be due to chikungunya, a coinfection of both, or even other similar viruses.

== Outbreaks history ==
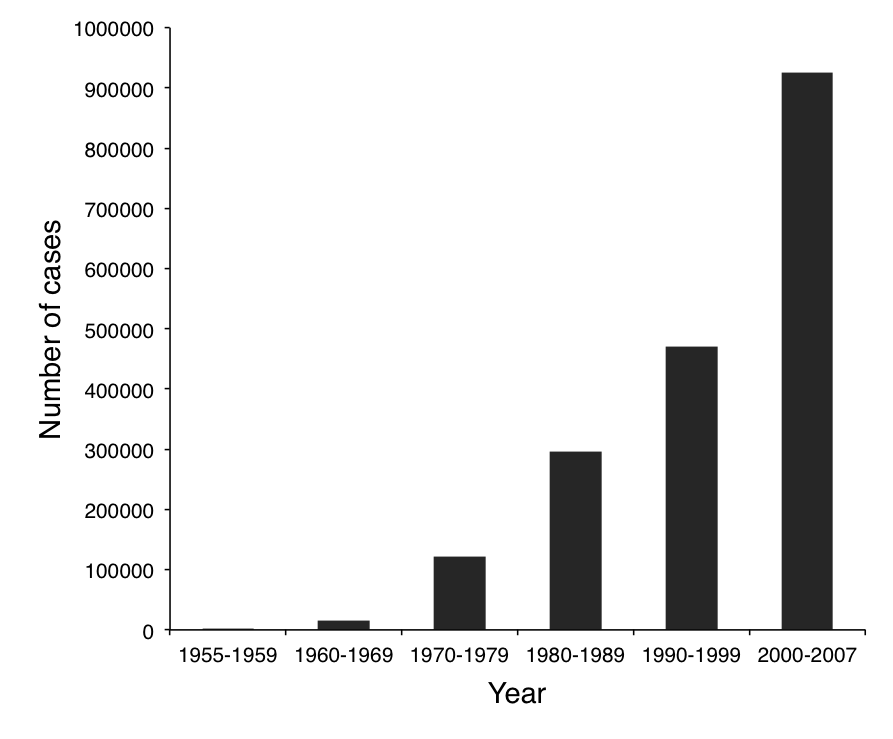
Average annual number of DF cases and DHF cases reported to WHO

=== 18th century ===
The first recognized dengue epidemics occurred almost simultaneously in Asia, Africa, and North America in the 1780s, shortly after the identification and naming of the disease in 1779.

=== 20th century ===
A pandemic began in Southeast Asia in the 1950s, and by 1975 dengue haemorrhagic fever (DHF) had become a leading cause of death among children in the region. The first case of DHF was reported in Manila around 1953 through 1954. A small child with dengue fever started to bleed uncontrollably. Other children then became victims to the new symptom. Epidemic dengue has become more common since the 1980s. By the late 1990s, dengue was the most important mosquito-borne disease affecting humans after malaria, with around 40 million cases of dengue fever and several hundred thousand cases of dengue hemorrhagic fever each year. Significant outbreaks of dengue fever tend to occur every five or six months. The cyclical rise and fall in numbers of dengue cases is thought to be the result of seasonal cycles interacting with a short-lived cross-immunity for all four strains in people who have had dengue. When the cross-immunity wears off the population is more susceptible to transmission whenever the next seasonal peak occurs. Thus over time there remain large numbers of susceptible people in affected populations despite previous outbreaks due to the four different serotypes of dengue virus and the presence of unexposed individuals from childbirth or immigration.

There is significant evidence, originally suggested by S.B. Halstead in the 1970s, that dengue hemorrhagic fever is more likely to occur in people who have secondary infections by another one of dengue fever's four serotypes. One model to explain this process is known as antibody-dependent enhancement (ADE), which allows for increased uptake and virion replication during a secondary infection with a different strain. Through an immunological phenomenon, known as original antigenic sin, the immune system is not able to adequately respond to the stronger infection, and the secondary infection becomes far more serious.

Reported cases of dengue are an under-representation of all cases when accounting for subclinical cases and cases where the patient did receive medical treatment.

=== 21st century ===
There was a serious outbreak in Rio de Janeiro during the summer of 2002 with 288,245 reported cases. On March 20, 2008, the secretary of health of the state of Rio de Janeiro, Sérgio Côrtes, announced that 23,555 cases of dengue, including 30 deaths, had been recorded in the state in less than three months. Côrtes said, "I am treating this as an epidemic because the number of cases is extremely high." Federal Minister of Health, José Gomes Temporão also announced that he was forming a panel to respond to the situation. Cesar Maia, mayor of the city of Rio de Janeiro, denied that there was serious cause for concern, saying that the incidence of cases was in fact declining from a peak at the beginning of February. By April 3, 2008, the number of cases reported rose to 55,000

In Singapore, the worst dengue outbreak is currently occurring. By 2 October 2020, there were more than 33,500 confirmed cases, and at least 29 deaths. This figure has exceeded the numbers of Singapore's previously worst dengue fever outbreak.

Dengue fever occurs widely in the tropics, including the southern United States, northern Argentina, northern Australia, Bangladesh, Barbados, Bolivia, Belize, Brazil, Cambodia, Colombia, Costa Rica, Cuba, Dominican Republic, French Polynesia, Guadeloupe, El Salvador, Grenada, Guatemala, Guyana, Haiti, Honduras, India, Indonesia, Jamaica, Laos, Malaysia, Melanesia, Mexico, Micronesia, Nicaragua, Pakistan, Panama, Paraguay, the Philippines, Puerto Rico, Samoa, Western Saudi Arabia, Singapore, Sri Lanka, Suriname, Taiwan, Thailand, Trinidad and Tobago, Venezuela and Vietnam, and increasingly in southern China.

A 2010 outbreak in Puerto Rico resulted in 5382 confirmed infections and 20 deaths. Nearby Guadeloupe and Martinique, in the French Caribbean, were affected as well: over 40000 clinical cases in each island required medical assistance (the outbreak peaked in August 2010 and was practically over by October). A considerable number of cases were recorded in the French/Dutch island of St.Martin/Sint Maarten as well, where dengue is endemic. There was an outbreak in Pakistan with more than 5000 confirmed infections and a mortality rate of 31. The 2009 and 2010 dengue outbreaks in Key West Florida are similar to the 2005 Texas (25 cases) and 2001 Hawaii (122 cases) outbreaks, which were locally sustained on American soil and not a result of travelers returning from endemic areas.

American visitors to and visitors from dengue-endemic regions will continue to present a potential pathway for the dengue virus to enter the United States and infect populations that have not been exposed to the virus for several decades. The health risks and rapidly escalating costs to the United States of unmonitored, unvaccinated and disease carrying travelers, legal and illegal, has been recently considered.

An outbreak of dengue fever was declared in Cairns, located in the tropical north of Queensland, Australia on 1 December 2008. As of 3 March 2009 there were 503 confirmed cases of dengue fever, in a residential population of 152,137. Outbreaks were subsequently declared the neighbouring cities and towns of Townsville (outbreak declared 5 January 2009), Port Douglas (6 February 2009), Yarrabah (19 February 2009), Injinoo (24 February 2009), Innisfail (27 February 2009) and Rockhampton (10 March 2009). There have been occurrences of dengue types one, two, three, and four in the region. On March 4, 2009, Queensland Health had confirmed an elderly woman had died from dengue fever in Cairns, in the first fatality since the epidemic began last year. The statement said that although the woman had other health problems, she tested positive for dengue and the disease probably contributed to her death.

An epidemic broke out in Bolivia in early 2009, in which 18 people died and 31,000 were infected.

In 2009, in Argentina, a dengue outbreak was declared the northern provinces of Chaco, Catamarca, Salta, Jujuy, and Corrientes, with over 9673 cases reported as of April 11, 2009 by the Health Ministry. Some travelers from the affected zones have spread the fever as far south as Buenos Aires. Major efforts to control the epidemic in Argentina are focused on preventing its vector (the Aedes mosquitoes) from reproducing. This is addressed by asking people to dry out all possible water reservoirs from where mosquitoes could proliferate (which is, in other countries, known as "descacharrado"). There were information campaigns concerning prevention of the dengue fever; and the government is fumigating with insecticide in order to control the mosquito population.

One of the South Asian countries still suffering highly from this problem is Sri Lanka.

An outbreak caused by serotype DENV-1 occurred in 2002 on Easter Island. Subsequent outbreaks occurred in 2006–2007 and 2008, 2009 and 2011 with decreasing magnitude over time. The male:female ratio in reported cases was approximately 1:1 and the average age at infection was 31.38 ± 18.37 in both sexes.

== 2010 ==
In many undeveloped regions, "authorities do not have adequate facilities to detect dengue cases." In the Philippines where patients seek herbal medication in lieu of hospitals for treating dengue, death rates as evidenced, are statistically far greater than other affected areas. Because many cases go unreported, higher statistics do not necessarily indicate a larger outbreak. In 2010, Latin America alone reported 1.5 million cases.

Country	Region	Confirmed Cases (in 2010)	Suspected Cases (in 2010)	Reported Deaths (in 2010)	Compared with previous year	Figures as of**
World (sum of all regions)		1,785,059	N.A.	2,398		
Brazil	–	1,011,548	–	656	406,269	mid Oct
Colombia	–	121,600	–	161	–	Sep 24
Indonesia	–	–	N/A	N/A	155,000 and 1386 deaths	no date
Philippines	–	119,789	–	724	49,319 (up 140%)	Nov 17
Venezuela	–	124,931	–	–	65,869	all of 2010
Thailand	–	108,863	–	131	up 134.7% on sep 27	Nov 20
Vietnam	–	~80,000	–	59	105,370 (whole year)	Sep
Honduras	–	69,745	–	81	13,351 (whole year)	December 2010
Malaysia	–	45,037	–	133	39,537	dec 17
Sri Lanka	–	26,824	–	192		mid Jul
Costa Rica	–	21,000	–	N/A	3,326	end Aug
Laos	–	14,659	–	39	7,214(whole year)	aug 28
Puerto Rico	–	13,990	–	22	–	Sep 18
Paraguay	–	13,678	6138	n/a	n/a	sep 30
Mexico	–	12,240	–	20	15,032	week 32 (sep)
Indonesia	Bali	10,230	–	29	N/A	Jan–Oct
Dominican Republic	–	8,839	–	41	3,000	Sep 3
El Salvador	–	6,458	15,068	1	n/a	week 28
India	Delhi	5,837	–	8	1,153	Nov 9
Pakistan	–	7,000+	–	35	–	Nov 22
Indonesia	North Sumatra	5,805	–	N/A	4,643 (whole year)	Sep
Indonesia	Semarang	5,284	–	43	3,883	Oct 12
Singapore	–	5,103	–	41	4,497	dec 11
Cambodia	–	3,771	–	10	2,355	to July
Saudi Arabia	Jeddah	2219	–	N/A		dec 16
France	Martinique	644	41970	17		Nov 22
France	Guadeloupe	418	44000	5		Nov 22
Guatemala	–	1,925	11,800	25		1 sep
Indonesia	Yogyakarta	1123	–	–	688 (whole year)	Sep 26
Taiwan	–	1211	–	2	1052	Nov 1
Trinidad and Tobago	–	1,200	–	4	N/A	end aug
India	Uttar Pradesh	496	–	8		Oct 20
Nepal	Chitwan	280	–	–	–	Oct 17, 2010
United States	–	198 (24-2010FL, 27-2009FL, 25-2005TX, 122-2001HI)		2 (2010, suspected)	Cases down 11% from 2009	Aug 3, 2010
France	Mayotte	75	–	N/A		Sep 1
Australia	Queensland	13	0	1		Nov 3, 2010

== 2011 ==
Philippines dengue case load for Q1 2011 was some 5% higher than the preceding year, at 18,885 cases and 115 deaths. For 2011 until April 16, Brazil has recorded some 56,882 cases with 39 deaths, Paraguay with 27,000 cases and 31 deaths.

A notable case was that of Trinidad and Tobago's first female Prime Minister, Kamla Persad-Bissessar, who was diagnosed with dengue fever in August 2011, prompting investigation into the possibility of an epidemic on the twin-island republic. In 2012 the Island of Madeira experienced its first outbreak of dengue with 1080 confirmed cases.

Some 52,008 cases of dengue fever were recorded in Thailand from Jan to Oct 16, 2012, with 50 deaths.

== 2012 ==
In 2012 the Island of Madeira experienced its first outbreak of dengue with 1080 confirmed cases.

Some 52,008 cases of dengue fever were recorded in Thailand from Jan to Oct 16, 2012, with 50 deaths.

== 2013 ==
Record dengue outbreaks reported in 2013 in many countries: Brazil (double deaths over 2012), Singapore, and Thailand (worst in 20 years), among others. San Pedro Sula, Honduras declared a dengue 'state of emergency', and Central America had its worst outbreaks since 2008. Polynesia experienced an 'unprecedented' series of outbreaks (14), along with Chikungunya and Zika virus.

In only 7 weeks, in Brazil some 205,000 cases of dengue were reported, a record. In Peru, nearly 400 cases have been reported until March 2013; two of them were fatal. Since the beginning of 2013, in Paraguay 35 people have died after contracting dengue fever and almost 70,000 are still infected. As of June, 150,000 people in Thailand have come down with it, with 50 deaths, and some 44 deaths in Laos and 11,000 cases, 14,000 cases in Singapore but only 6 deaths, 22 deaths in Malaysia and 10,500 cases while 42,500 cases in Philippines with about 200 deaths.

== 2014 ==
Dengue deaths have tripled in Malaysia until Feb 2014 over 2013, after tripling 2013 over 2012.

Due to Typhoon Haiyan striking the Philippines early 2014, stagnant waters and heavy rain have been on constant watch due to mosquitoes breeding and causing epidemics around the area.

Yoyogi Park in Tokyo became a breeding ground for dengue fever carrying mosquitoes. On September 2, the Japanese health ministry confirmed that 34 people had been infected.

A study claims India has 6 million unreported dengue cases annually, while in Guangdong, China, a 15-fold increase over last year and 5-fold increase of mosquitos has left the normally lightly hit region stunned. Likewise Taiwan also had a 10-fold increase in cases this year.

== 2015 ==
2015 saw a dengue outbreak in Taiwan.

Outbreaks intensified in nearly all tropical areas, with endemic extent, deaths, and caseloads all reported at new highs, with the Americas reporting 2 million symptomatic cases. In tropical/subtropical Asia, nearly all nations had reported explosive increases. With one sole exception, China's caseload has plunged to less than a tenth of the prior year due to massive releases of sterilized mosquitos.

Dengue appeared in the Hawaiian Islands in late 2015, with at least 190 cases confirmed by year end. Most cases were reported on the island of Hawaii (the "Big Island").

== 2016 ==
Argentina registered a Dengue fever outbreak in late January 2016 with 13 of 24 provinces affected.

In Thailand, officials anticipated as many cases in 2016 as occurred during a large outbreak in 1978, the largest ever recorded. From the beginning of the year to March, more than 8,000 cases had occurred, compared with just over 4,000 cases over the same period in 2015.

== 2017 ==
A Dengue fever outbreak in the Indian state of Kerala in May and June 2017 had caused 6808 confirmed infections and 13 deaths by June 16.

In Sri Lanka, there were 180,000 reported cases in 2017. The majority of cases being reported from the Western province. The highest numbers of dengue cases were reported during the 20 week of 2017. Sri Lankan health authorities warned that the country was facing a dengue epidemic with at least 301 patients dead.

== 2018 ==
According to European Centre for Disease Prevention and Control, 27 countries reported 2,191 dengue cases in 2018

== 2019 ==
A dengue fever outbreak in Bangladesh starting in April 2019 has caused 18,484 infected patients and 57 deaths. There were more than 100,000 cases in Sri Lanka.

A dengue epidemic has been declared in the Philippines after 600 dead and over 150,000 cases reported.

In the summer of 2019 an outbreak was confirmed in Oceania. 276 cases and one death were reported in the Marshall Islands, resulting in the government halting travel between the urban centers of Ebeye and Majuro to the outer islands. Outbreaks were also reported in Palau, Federated States of Micronesia, the Cook Islands, Tuvalu, and the Philippines.

In end of December 2018, a man who had no recent travel history tested positive for dengue fever in Oman. It is thought the Aedes Aegypti mosquito, which had been reportedly seen in some parts of Muscat, is the cause of the outbreak of dengue fever in parts of Oman. The outbreak was easily controlled though, with only 343 suspected cases and 59 confirmed cases by April 2019.

Mexico reported 41,505 cases and 191 deaths, with Jalisco being the state with the most infections (11,727) and deaths (49).

== 2020 ==
1,346,991 cases of dengue fever were reported in Latin America between January 2019 and March 2020; 1,530 people died. The countries with the highest rates were Nicaragua (2,271 cases per 100,000 inhabitants), Belize (1,021), Honduras (995.5), and El Salvador (375). Bolivia reported 7,700 cases. Mexico had 24,313 cases and 79 deaths; the state of Jalisco reported the highest numbers (5,362 cases and 20 deaths), followed by Tabasco (9 deaths), and Michoacán (2,517 cases).

Health authorities warned that efforts to combat the COVID-19 pandemic hampered efforts to combat dengue. At least 1.1 million cases of dengue and nearly 400 deaths from the disease were reported in Brazil, where there were over 3.1 million COVID-19 infections.

== 2021-22 ==
During the COVID-19 pandemic, official reporting of many other infectious diseases was significantly disrupted, with a sharp drop across the board.

== 2023 ==
In September 2023 The Ministry of Health and Wellness of Jamaica declared a dengue outbreak after a significant rise in cases. The Guardian reported that the outbreak was influenced by the heat, as the summer of 2023 recorded the highest temperature in 100,000 years.

== 2024 ==
Brazil is facing a significant outbreak of dengue fever, with public health experts indicating that this surge is a precursor to an increase in cases across the Americas, including Puerto Rico. Brazil's Health Ministry anticipates over 4.2 million cases this year, surpassing the 4.1 million cases reported by the Pan American Health Organization for all 42 countries in the region last year. While Brazil typically experiences fluctuations in dengue cases on a four-year cycle, experts attribute the intensified problem this year to factors such as El Niño and climate change.

Argentina is experiencing its worst dengue outbreak in history, with more than 100,000 positive cases in the first three months of the year, eleven times higher than the same period in 2023. Interviewed by Página/12, infectologist Leda Guzzi explained the outbreak with five main points: the exponential increase in the number of cases is up to 11 times higher than last year; the early timing of the outbreak was anticipated by at least four weeks; in 2023 the winter continued with viral transmission; there was co-circulation of three serotypes; and there have already been several epidemics in the last decade, which leads to an accumulation of people who have already had an episode of dengue fever. The new government of Javier Milei, who took office as president in December 2023, refused to carry out awareness campaigns or guarantee access to free vaccination against the disease (unlike Brazil), due to its intransigent policy of drastically reducing public spending. When asked about this, presidential spokesperson Manuel Adorni argued that "the effectiveness [of the vaccine] has not been proven", although it was approved in Argentina in April 2023. In general terms, the government's official position has been to ignore the epidemic and its health minister Mario Russo made almost no reference to the situation, centralizing communication with Adorni. As of March 20, 69 deaths from the disease had been recorded so far in 2024. Eventually, the severity of the epidemic led the government to launch its first advertising spot providing basic prevention information on March 21. For his part, Russo, who had had no public presence in his first 13 weeks, met on March 25 with the health ministers of all the provinces at the first meeting of the Federal Health Council (Consejo Federal de Salud; COFESA).

== 2025 ==
As to outbreaks in 2025 we find that more than 3 million cases and more than 1,400 deaths have been reported across 90 countries to this point in the year (July) 2024 saw record-high cases (over 13 million), the first half of 2025 has shown a decrease in the Americas. As of epidemiological week 25 (17, July 2025) suspected cases were down 70 percent compared to the same period in 2024, and 11 percent below the five-year average. However, some areas like Mexico still show outbreaks. The simultaneous circulation of all four dengue virus serotypes (DENV 1-4) is observed in several countries in the Americas As of August 2025 there are almost 4 million cases with 2,700 deaths per the WHO.

The CDC indicates that dengue transmission remains high in the Americas, with Puerto Rico and the US Virgin Islands still under outbreak declarations. In Hawaii 9 cases, during the month of July, have been identified (all travel related). On 12 August, Hawaii reported its 12th case of dengue this year

Edo State (Nigeria) officially declared a dengue outbreak with 86 confirmed cases across multiple areas In Africa 7,000 to 8,700 cases and 7 deaths have been recorded with outbreaks in multiple countries

It has been reported that Bangladesh has "10,296 dengue cases and 42 confirmed deaths were recorded in the country between January and June this year, according to the Directorate General of Health Services" On July 18, it was reported that one dengue patient had died, and 394 others were admitted to hospitals across the country in the past 24 hours As of 11 August, the government indicated that " the death toll [is] 101 and total reported cases 24,183" On 31 August it was reported that the case count had risen to 32,028

On July 21 it was reported that the country of Laos has some 4,308 cases of dengue fever, which includes one death Near the end of July, Iloilo (Philippines) so far has 2,927 dengue cases reported (with 247 new infections recorded in just one week) which is a 20.8 percent increase compared to last year's 2024 total of 2,424 cases

The Centers for Disease Control and Prevention indicated as of 31 July, that there were 2,553 cases in the U.S.
