= 2023 dengue outbreak in Jamaica =

Disease outbreak in Jamaica

- Disease: Dengue fever
- Pathogen: Dengue virus
- Location: Jamaica
- Date: 2023
- Confirmed cases: 3,147

In 2023, reported cases of dengue fever in Jamaica rose significantly. In September 2023 The Ministry of Health and Wellness, Jamaica declared it as an outbreak. The Guardian reported that the outbreak was influenced by the heat as summer of 2023 was recorded as the highest temperature in 100,000 years.

== Outbreak ==
The outbreak peaked at around September with over 500 cases across the island. Andrew Holness, the Prime Minister of Jamaica announced a programme of around $200 million to curb the spread of virus at schools, households and communities. It was declared as outbreak by Health ministry in September citing that virus surpassed the epidemic threshold for July and August and was heading towards same for September. The number of confirmed cases as reported by health ministry were 3,147 with nine deaths, as of November 2023.

== Statistics ==
Status (as of November 2023)
Number of cases	3,147
Number of deaths	9
