= Dengue vaccine =

Vaccine against dengue fever

Vaccine description
- Target: Dengue fever
- Vaccine type: Attenuated

Clinical data
- Trade names: Dengvaxia, Qdenga
- Other names: CYD-TDV
- AHFS/Drugs.com: Monograph
- License data: US DailyMed: Dengvaxia
- Routes of administration: Subcutaneous
- ATC code: J07BX04 (WHO)

Legal status
- Legal status: AU: S4 (Prescription only); BR: Approved; UK: POM (Prescription only); US: Rx-only (Dengvaxia); EU: Rx-only; In general: ℞ (Prescription only)

Identifiers
- CAS Number: 1704605-80-0
- DrugBank: DB15521
- ChemSpider: none

Dengue vaccine is a vaccine used to prevent dengue fever in humans. Development of dengue vaccines began in the 1920s but was hindered by the need to create immunity against all four dengue serotypes. As of 2023, there are two commercially available vaccines, sold under the brand names Dengvaxia and Qdenga.

Dengvaxia is only recommended in those who have previously had dengue fever or populations in which most people have been previously infected due to a phenomenon known as antibody-dependent enhancement. The value of Dengvaxia is limited by the fact that it may increase the risk of severe dengue in those who have not previously been infected. In 2017, more than 733,000 children and more than 50,000 adult volunteers were vaccinated with Dengvaxia regardless of serostatus, which led to a controversy. Qdenga is designated for people not previously infected.

There are other vaccine candidates in development including live attenuated, inactivated, DNA and subunit vaccines.

== History ==
In December 2018, Dengvaxia was approved in the European Union.

In May 2019, Dengvaxia was approved in the United States as the first vaccine approved for the prevention of dengue disease caused by all dengue virus serotypes (1, 2, 3, and 4) in people ages nine through 16 who have laboratory-confirmed previous dengue infection and who live in endemic areas. Dengue is endemic in the US territories of American Samoa, Guam, Puerto Rico, and the US Virgin Islands.

The safety and effectiveness of the vaccine were determined in three randomized, placebo-controlled studies involving approximately 35,000 individuals in dengue-endemic areas, including Puerto Rico, Latin America, and the Asia Pacific region. The vaccine was determined to be approximately 76 percent effective in preventing symptomatic, laboratory-confirmed dengue disease in individuals 9 through 16 years of age who previously had laboratory-confirmed dengue disease.

In March 2021, the European Medicines Agency accepted the filing package for TAK-003 (Qdenga) intended for markets outside of the EU.

In August 2022, the Indonesian FDA approved Qdenga for use in individuals six years to 45 years of age and became the first authority in the world to approve Qdenga. Qdenga was approved in the European Union in December 2022.

== CYD-TDV (Dengvaxia) ==
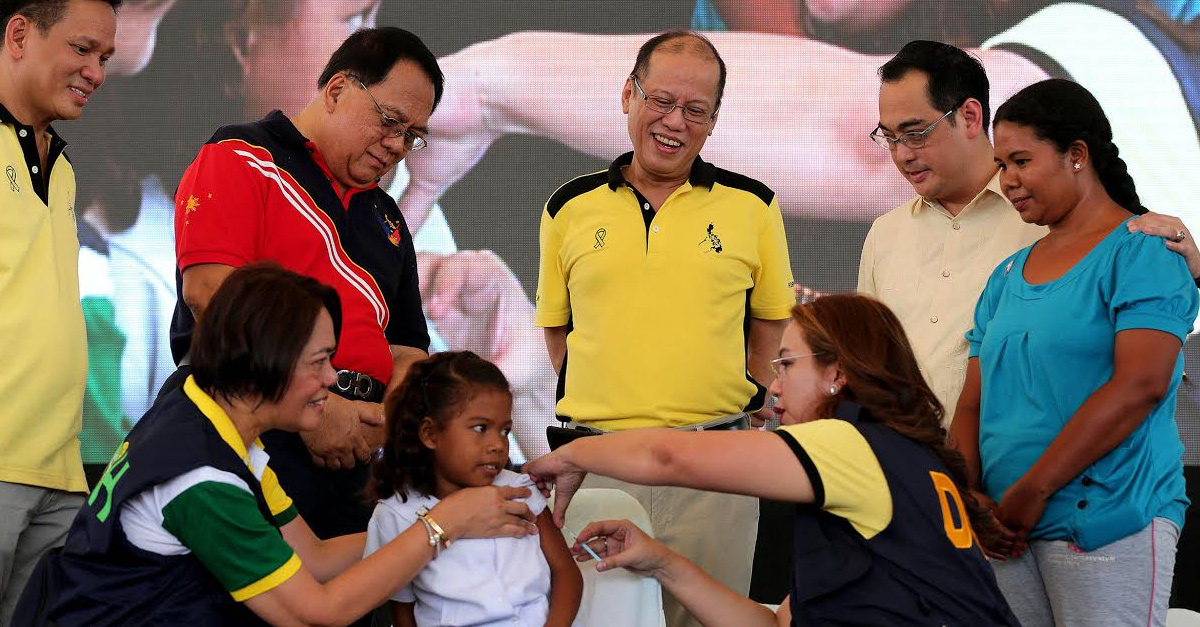
A child receives Dengvaxia vaccine.

CYD-TDV, sold under the brand name Dengvaxia and made by Sanofi Pasteur, is a live attenuated tetravalent vaccine that is administered as three separate injections, with the initial dose followed by two additional shots given six and twelve months later. The US Food and Drug Administration (FDA) granted the application for Dengvaxia priority review designation and a tropical disease priority review voucher. The approval of Dengvaxia was granted to Sanofi Pasteur.

The vaccine has been approved in 19 countries and the European Union, but it is not approved in the US for use in individuals not previously infected by any dengue virus serotype or for whom this information is unknown.

Dengvaxia is a chimeric vaccine made using recombinant DNA technology by replacing the PrM (pre-membrane) and E (envelope) structural genes of the yellow fever attenuated 17D strain vaccine with those from the four dengue serotypes. Evidence indicates that CYD-TDV is partially effective in preventing infection, but may lead to a higher risk of severe disease in those who have not been previously infected and then do go on to contract the disease. It is not clear why the vaccinated seronegative population had more serious adverse outcomes. A plausible hypothesis is the phenomenon of antibody-dependent enhancement (ADE). American virologist Scott Halstead was one of the first researchers to identify the ADE phenomenon. Dr. Halstead and his colleague Dr. Phillip Russell proposed that the vaccine only be used after antibody testing, to check for prior dengue exposure and avoid vaccination of sero-negative individuals.

Common side effects include headache, pain at the site of injection, and general muscle pains. Severe side effects may include anaphylaxis. Use is not recommended in people with poor immune function. Safety of use during pregnancy is unclear. Dengvaxia is a weakened but live vaccine and works by triggering an immune response against four types of dengue virus.

Dengvaxia became commercially available in 2016 in 11 countries: Mexico, the Philippines, Indonesia, Brazil, El Salvador, Costa Rica, Paraguay, Guatemala, Peru, Thailand, and Singapore. In 2019 it was approved for medical use in the United States. It is on the World Health Organization's List of Essential Medicines.

In 2017, the manufacturer recommended that the vaccine only be used in people who have previously had a dengue infection, as outcomes may be worsened in those who have not been previously infected due to antibody-dependent enhancement. This led to a controversy in the Philippines where more than 733,000 children and more than 50,000 adult volunteers were vaccinated regardless of serostatus.

The World Health Organization (WHO) recommends that countries should consider vaccination with the dengue vaccine CYD-TDV only if the risk of severe dengue in seronegative individuals can be minimized either through pre-vaccination screening or recent documentation of high seroprevalence rates in the area (at least 80% by age nine years).

The WHO updated its recommendations regarding the use of Dengvaxia in 2018, based on long-term safety data stratified by serostatus on 29 November 2017. Seronegative vaccine recipients have an excess risk of severe dengue compared to unvaccinated seronegative individuals. For every 13 hospitalizations prevented in seropositive vaccinees, there would be 1 excess hospitalization in seronegative vaccinees per 1,000 vaccinees. WHO recommends serological testing for past dengue infection

In 2017, the manufacturer recommended that the vaccine only be used in people who have previously had a dengue infection as otherwise there was evidence it may worsen subsequent infections. The initial protocol did not require baseline blood samples before vaccination to establish an understanding of increased risk of severe dengue in participants who had not been previously exposed. In November 2017, Sanofi acknowledged that some participants were put at risk of severe dengue if they had no prior exposure to the infection; subsequently, the Philippine government suspended the mass immunization program with the backing of the WHO which began a review of the safety data.

Phase III trials in Latin America and Asia involved over 31,000 children between the ages of two and 14 years. In the first reports from the trials, vaccine efficacy was 56.5% in the Asian study and 64.7% in the Latin American study in patients who received at least one injection of the vaccine. Efficacy varied by serotype. In both trials vaccine reduced by about 80% the number of severe dengue cases. An analysis of both the Latin American and Asian studies at the 3rd year of follow-up showed that the efficacy of the vaccine was 65.6% in preventing hospitalization in children older than nine years of age, but considerably greater (81.9%) for seropositive children (indicating previous dengue infection) at baseline. The vaccination series consists of three injections at 0, 6 and 12 months. The vaccine was approved in Mexico, the Philippines, and Brazil in December 2015, and in El Salvador, Costa Rica, Paraguay, Guatemala, Peru, Indonesia, Thailand, and Singapore in 2016. Under the brand name Dengvaxia, it is approved for use for those aged nine years of age and older and can prevent all four serotypes. As of February 2025, Sanofi announced that Dengvaxia has been "definitely discontinued" in Brazil due to low demand, which may have been caused by Qdenga being the first choice locally as its safer for individuals with unknown dengue serostatus.

== TAK-003 (Qdenga) ==
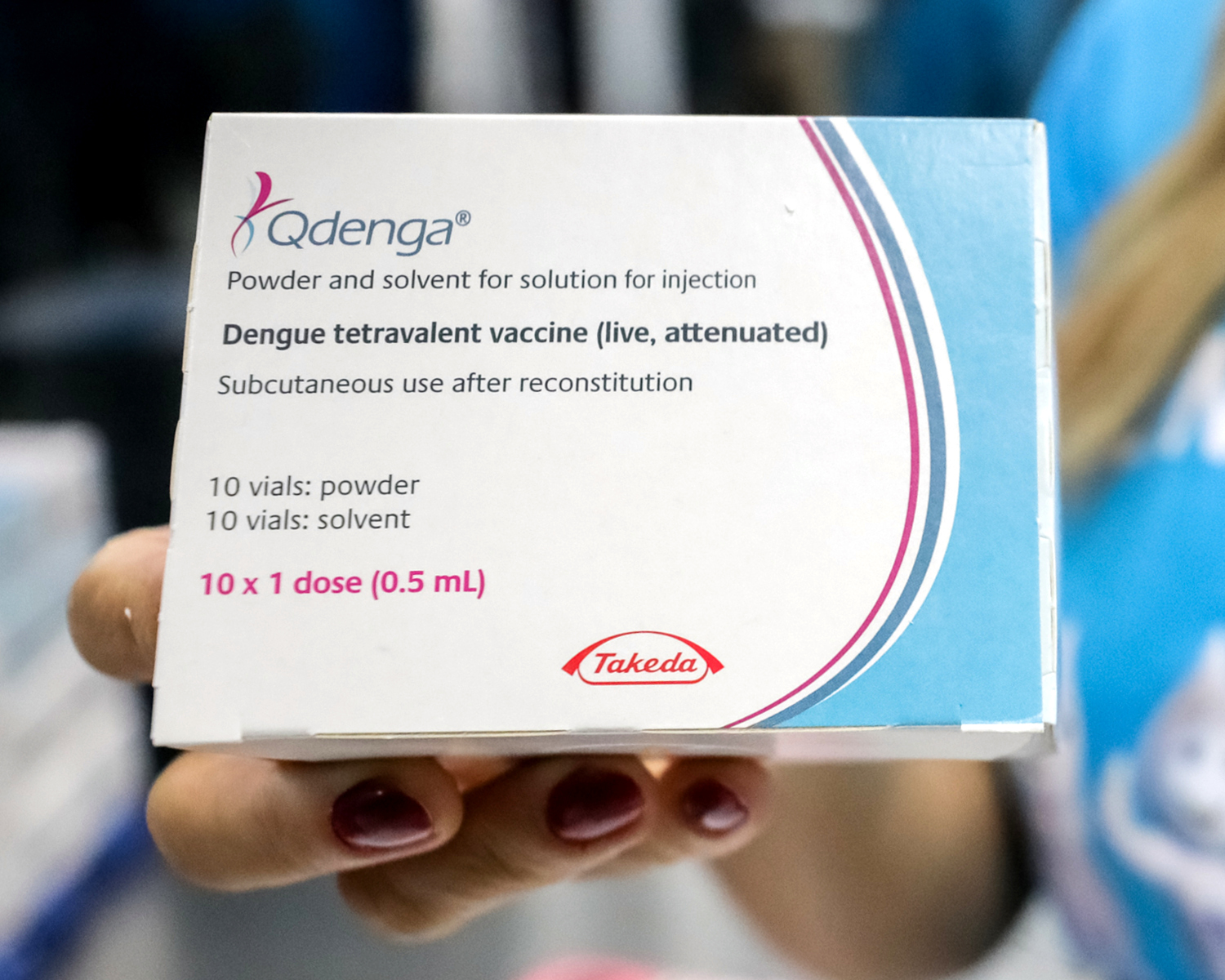
A carton of Qdenga vials awaiting administration in Brasília, Brazil

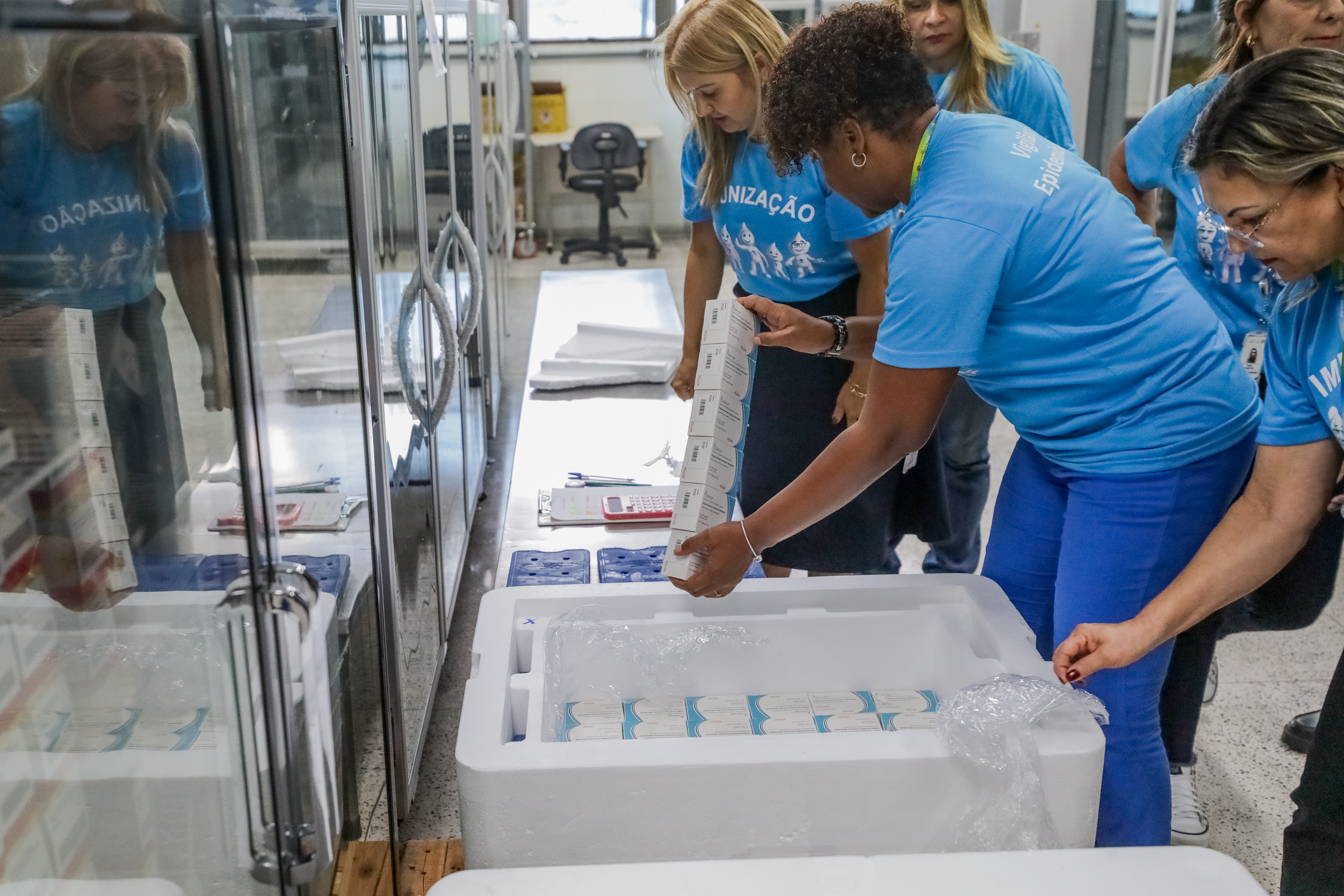
Workers in a cold chain facility in Brazil transferring boxes of Qdenga.

TAK-003 or DENVax, sold under the brand name Qdenga and made by Takeda, is a recombinant chimeric attenuated vaccine with DENV1, DENV3, and DENV4 components on a dengue virus type 2 (DENV2) backbone originally developed at Mahidol University in Bangkok and now funded by Inviragen (DENVax) and (TAK-003). Phase I and II trials were conducted in the United States, Colombia, Puerto Rico, Singapore and Thailand. The 18-month data published in the journal Lancet Infectious Diseases, indicate that TAK-003 produced sustained antibody responses against all four virus strains, regardless of previous dengue exposure and dosing schedule.

Data from the phase III trial, which began in September 2016, show that TAK-003 was efficacious against symptomatic dengue. TAK-003 appears to not lack efficacy in seronegative people or potentially cause them harm, unlike CYD-TDV. The data appear to show only moderate efficacy in other dengue serotypes than DENV2.

In February 2024, a clinical trial involving 20,099 healthy children aged 4 to 16 in eight dengue-endemic countries reported that, over 4.5 years, the vaccine was approximately 79% effective in preventing hospitalization and 54% effective against confirmed dengue in individuals with no prior exposure to the virus (seronegative). For all participants combined (seronegative and seropositive), the efficacy was approximately 84% against hospitalization and 61% against confirmed dengue. It protected against all four serotypes in seropositive participants. For seronegative participants, it protected against DENV-1 and DENV-2, but not against DENV-3, and there were too few cases of DENV-4 to allow conclusions.

Qdenga received approval for use in the European Union in 2022 for people aged 4 and above, and is also approved in the United Kingdom, Brazil, Argentina, Indonesia, and Thailand. Takeda voluntarily withdrew their application for the vaccination's approval in the United States in July 2023 after the FDA sought further data from the firm, which the company stated could not be provided during the current review cycle.

In July 2026, India's drug regulator approved Qdenga for people aged four to 60, making it the country's first approved dengue vaccine. Takeda said it expected the vaccine to become available through private healthcare providers in the first half of 2027.

== TV-003/005 (Butantan-dv, DengiAll) ==
TV-003/005 is a single dose attenuated vaccine consisting of a tetravalent admixture of monovalent vaccines, originally developed by NIAID. It is currently licensed as Butantan-DV in Brazil but roll-out was paused in June 2026.

The vaccine passed phase I trials and phase II studies in the US, Thailand, Bangladesh, India, and Brazil by 2016.

The National Institutes of Health conducted phase I and phase II studies in over 1,000 participants in the US. It has also conducted human challenge studies while having conducted NHP model studies successfully.

NIH has licensed their technology for further development and commercial scale manufacturing to Panacea Biotec, Serum Institute of India, Instituto Butantan, Vabiotech, Merck, and Medigen.

In Brazil, phase III studies were conducted by Instituto Butantan in collaboration with NIH. Panacea Biotec has conducted phase II clinical studies in India. 2024 data from the double-blind, Phase 3 clinical trial showed 75.3% efficacy in seronegative patients and 89.2% efficacy in seropositive patients, although hospitalization was not assess. The vaccine demonstrated long-term efficacy in all 4 DENV serotypes in previously exposed individuals but was only effective against types 1 and 2 for those who have never been infected by dengue.

A company in Vietnam (Vabiotech) is conducting safety tests and developing a clinical trial plan. All four companies are involved in studies of a TetraVax-DV vaccine in conjunction with the US NIH.

India is nearing completion of Phase III clinical trials for its first indigenous one-shot dengue vaccine, DengiAll, developed by Panacea Biotec in collaboration with the Indian Council of Medical Research (ICMR). Over 10,000 participants are being enrolled across 20 centres, with 8,000 already dosed. The vaccine, based on the NIH-developed tetravalent strain (TV003/TV005), aims to offer protection against all four dengue serotypes—an essential yet complex goal due to low cross-immunity. Early trial results report no safety concerns, and the vaccine's long-term efficacy and as of 2025 is under two-year evaluation.

The single dose vaccine was approved for use as Butantan-DV in Brazil in 2025. The vaccine was first rolled out to healthcare workers only in February 2026. The roll-out was paused in June 2026 after two deaths as a precautionary measure.

== In development ==
=== Inactivated vaccines ===
==== TDENV PIV ====
GlaxoSmithKline (GSK) and the Walter Reed Army Institute of Research (WRAIR) collaborated to develop TDENV-PIV (tetravalent dengue virus purified inactivated vaccine). This contains all four DENV serotypes. Initially, a monovalent DENV-1 PIV vaccine candidate was tested in phase 1 clinical trials that showed it was very safe and generated immune responses. However, inactivated DENV vaccines are known to have reduced immunogenicity compared to live-attenuated vaccines. Thus, TDEN-PIV has been evaluated in phase 1 trials in combination with different adjuvants to determine safety and efficacy. The most effective combination is now being tested in a phase 2 clinical trial.

=== DNA vaccines ===
==== D1ME100 (TVDV/Vaxfectin) ====
D1ME100 (also known as TVDV or Vaxfectin) is a DNA vaccine containing four plasmids that carry genes encoding specific proteins from each DENV serotype. It was tested initially in monkeys and humans and shown to be safe, however it lacked sufficient immunogenicity.

=== V180 ===
Merck is studying recombinant subunit vaccines expressed in Drosophila cells. As of 2019, it had completed phase I stage and found V180 formulations to be generally well-tolerated and produce sufficient immunity.

=== Peptide vaccines ===
==== PepGNP-Dengue ====
Several studies have designed peptide vaccines for DENV, but only one has so far been evaluated in a phase 1 trial. This is PepGNP-Dengue, a gold nanoparticle-based, multivalent, synthetic peptide dengue vaccine candidate.

== Society and culture ==
=== Legal status ===
On 13 October 2022, the Committee for Medicinal Products for Human Use (CHMP) of the European Medicines Agency (EMA) adopted a positive opinion, recommending the granting of a marketing authorization for the medicinal product Qdenga, intended for prophylaxis against dengue disease. The applicant for this medicinal product is Takeda GmbH. The active substance of Qdenga is dengue tetravalent vaccine (live, attenuated), a viral vaccine containing live attenuated dengue viruses which replicate locally and elicit humoral and cellular immune responses against the four dengue virus serotypes. Qdenga was approved for medical use in the European Union in December 2022.

In February 2023, Qdenga was approved by the UK Medicines and Healthcare products Regulatory Agency (MHRA) for people aged four years and older.

In April 2023, the Argentina's National Administration of Drugs, Food and Medical Technology (ANMAT) gave the green light to the use of the tetravalent vaccine TAK-003 known as Qdenga, developed by the Japanese laboratory Takeda Pharmaceutical Company, making it the only vaccine approved to date. to combat dengue in Argentina. It has been used in the 2024 dengue epidemic.

In July 2023, Takeda withdrew its application for Qdenga before the FDA, citing the FDA's requirement for additional data not captured in the phase III studies.

=== Economics ===
In Indonesia, Dengvaxia costs about US$207 for the recommended three doses as of 2016. Indonesia was the first country to approve Qdenga, in late 2022.

=== Controversies ===
==== Philippines ====
The 2017 dengue vaccine controversy in the Philippines involved a vaccination program run by the Philippines Department of Health (DOH). The DOH vaccinated schoolchildren with Sanofi Pasteur's CYD-TDV (Dengvaxia) dengue vaccine. Some of the children who received the vaccine had never been infected by the dengue virus before. The program was stopped when Sanofi Pasteur advised the government that the vaccine could put previously uninfected people at a somewhat higher risk of a severe case of dengue fever. A political controversy erupted over whether the program was run with sufficient care and who should be held responsible for the alleged harm to the vaccinated children.
