= List of epidemics and pandemics =

Infectious diseases with high prevalence are separately (sometimes in addition to their epidemics), such as malaria, which may have killed 50–60 million people.

== Major epidemics and pandemics ==
=== By death toll ===
Ongoing epidemics and pandemics are in bold face. For a given epidemic or pandemic, the average of its estimated death toll range is used for ranking. If the death toll averages of two or more epidemics or pandemics are equal, then the smaller the range, the higher the rank. For the historical records of major changes in the world population, see world population.

Epidemics, endemics, and pandemics with at least 1 million deaths
Rank	Epidemics/pandemics	Disease	Death toll (million)	Percentage of population lost	Years	Location
1	1918 "Spanish" influenza pandemic	Influenza A/H1N1	25–100	1–5.4% of global population	1918–1920	Worldwide
2	Plague of Justinian	Bubonic plague	15–100	25–60% of European population	541–549	North Africa, Europe, and Western Asia
**3**	**HIV/AIDS pandemic**	**HIV/AIDS**	**45 (as of 2026)**	?	**1981–present**	**Worldwide**
4	Black Death	Bubonic plague	25–50	30–60% of European population	1346–1353	North Africa, Europe, and Asia
**5**	**COVID-19 pandemic**	**COVID-19**	**7.12–38 (as of 2026)**	**0.4375% of global population (as of 2026)**	**2019–present**	**Worldwide**
6	Third plague pandemic	Bubonic plague	12–15	?	1855–1960	Worldwide
7	Cocoliztli epidemic of 1545–1548	Cocoliztli (caused by an unidentified pathogen)	5–15	27–80% of Mexican population	1545–1548	Mexico
8	Antonine Plague	Smallpox or measles	5–10	25–33% of Roman population	165–180 (possibly up to 190)	Roman Empire
9	1520 Mexico smallpox epidemic	Smallpox	5–8	23–37% of Mexican population	1519–1520	Mexico
**10**	**Seventh cholera pandemic**	**Cholera**	**1.4–9.3 (as of 2026)**	?	**1961–present**	**Worldwide**
11	1957–1958 influenza pandemic	Influenza A/H2N2	1–4	?	1957–1958	Worldwide
12	Hong Kong flu	Influenza A/H3N2	1–4	?	1968–1969	Worldwide
13	1918–1922 Russia typhus epidemic	Typhus	2–3	1–1.6% of Russian population	1918–1922	Russia
14	Cocoliztli epidemic of 1576	Cocoliztli	2–2.5	50% of Mexican population	1576–1580	Mexico
15	Jian'an Plague	Unknown (possibly typhoid fever or viral hemorrhagic fever)	2	?	217	Han dynasty
16	735–737 Japanese smallpox epidemic	Smallpox	2	33% of Japanese population	735–737	Japan
17	1772–1773 Persian Plague	Bubonic plague	2	?	1772–1773	Persia
18	Naples Plague	Bubonic plague	1.25	?	1656–1658	Italy (Southern)
19	1629–1631 Italian plague	Bubonic plague	1	?	1629–1631	Italy
20	1846–1860 cholera pandemic	Cholera	1	?	1846–1860	Worldwide
21	1889–1890 pandemic	Influenza or human coronavirus OC43	1	?	1889–1890	Worldwide

=== Infectious diseases with high prevalence ===
There have been various major infectious diseases with high prevalence worldwide, but they are currently not listed in the above table as epidemics/pandemics due to the lack of definite data, such as time span and death toll.

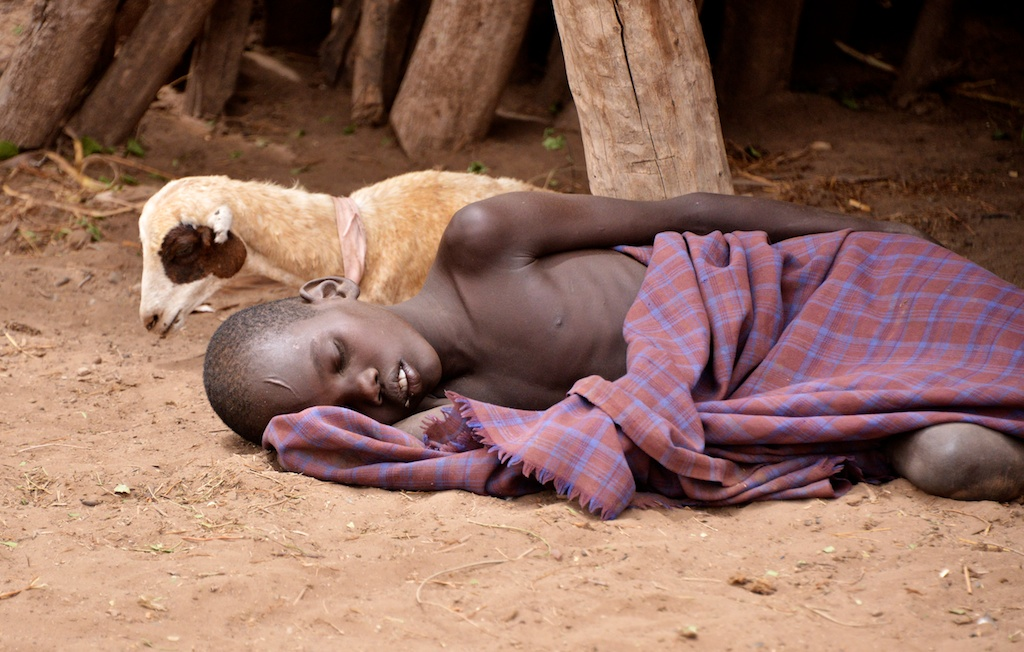
An Ethiopian child with malaria, a disease with an annual death rate of 610,000 as of 2024.

- Malaria has had multiple documented temporary epidemics in otherwise non-affected or low-prevalence areas. Malaria is commonly spread by mosquitoes. The vast majority of its deaths are due to its constant prevalence in affected areas.
- Tuberculosis (TB) became epidemic in Europe in the 18th and 19th century, showing a seasonal pattern, and is still taking place globally. Its symptoms include coughing up blood. It can generally be treated with strong antibiotics; untreated TB can be fatal. An opportunistic infection, TB is the leading cause of death of those with HIV/AIDS, and is considered an AIDS-defining clinical condition. The association between HIV/AIDS and TB has been described as the "TB/HIV syndemic". According to the World Health Organization, approximately 10 million new TB infections occur every year, and 1.5 million people die from it each year – making it the world's top infectious killer (before COVID-19 pandemic). However, there is a lack of sources which describe major TB epidemics with definite time spans and death tolls.
- Hepatitis B: According to the World Health Organization, as of 2019 there are about 296 million people living with chronic hepatitis B, with 1.5 million new infections each year. In 2019, hepatitis B caused about 820,000 deaths, mostly from cirrhosis and hepatocellular carcinoma (primary liver cancer). In many places of Asia and Africa, hepatitis B has become endemic. In addition, a person is sometimes infected with both hepatitis B virus (HBV) and HIV, and this population (about 2.7 million) accounts for about 1% of the total HBV infections.
- Hepatitis C: According to the World Health Organization, there are approximately 58 million people with chronic hepatitis C, with about 1.5 million new infections occurring per year. In 2019, approximately 290,000 people died from the disease, mostly from cirrhosis and hepatocellular carcinoma (primary liver cancer). There have been many hepatitis C virus (HCV) epidemics in history.

== Chronology ==
=== Pre-1500s ===
Chronological table of epidemic and pandemic events before the 1500s
Event	Years	Location	Disease	Death toll (estimate)	Ref.
1350 BC plague of Megiddo	1350 BC (circa)	Megiddo, land of Canaan	Unknown. In the Amarna letters EA 244, Biridiya, the mayor of Megiddo complains to Amenhotep III of his area being "consumed by death, plague and dust"	?	
Hittite Plague/"Hand of Nergal"	1330 BC (circa)	Near East, Hittite Empire, Alashiya, possibly Egypt	Unknown, possibly Tularemia. Mentioned in Amarna letter EA 35 as the "Hand of Nergal", cause of death of Šuppiluliuma I.	?	
Plague of Athens	430–426 BC	Greece, Libya, Egypt, Ethiopia	Unknown, possibly typhus, typhoid fever or viral hemorrhagic fever	75,000–100,000	
412 BC epidemic	412 BC	Greece (Northern Greece, Roman Republic)	Unknown, possibly influenza	473,000 (10% of the Roman Population)	
Antonine Plague	165–180 (possibly up to 190)	Roman Empire	Unknown, possibly smallpox	5–10 million	
Jian'an Plague	217	Han dynasty	Unknown, possibly typhoid fever or viral hemorrhagic fever	2 million	
Plague of Cyprian	249–262	Europe	Unknown, possibly smallpox or viral hemorrhagic fever	310,000	
Plague of Justinian (beginning of first plague pandemic)	541–549	Europe and West Asia	Bubonic plague	15–100 million	
580 Dysentery Epidemic in Gaul	580	Gaul	Dysentery or possibly smallpox	450,000 (10% of the Gaul population)	
Roman Plague of 590 (part of first plague pandemic)	590	Rome, Byzantine Empire	Bubonic plague	?	
Plague of Sheroe (part of first plague pandemic)	627–628	Bilad al-Sham	Bubonic plague	25,000+	
Plague of Amwas (part of first plague pandemic)	638–639	Byzantine Empire, West Asia, Africa	Bubonic plague	25,000+	
Plague of 664 (part of first plague pandemic)	664–689	British Isles	Bubonic plague	?	
Plague of 698–701 (part of first plague pandemic)	698–701	Byzantine Empire, West Asia, Syria, Mesopotamia	Bubonic plague	?	
735–737 Japanese smallpox epidemic	735–737	Japan	Smallpox	2 million (approx. 1/3 of Japanese population)	
Plague of 746–747 (part of first plague pandemic)	746–747	Byzantine Empire, West Asia, Africa	Bubonic plague	?	
Black Death (start of the second plague pandemic)	1346–1353	Eurasia and North Africa	Bubonic plague	25–50 million (30–60% of European population and 33% percent of the Middle Eastern population)	
Sweating sickness (multiple outbreaks)	1485–1551	Britain (England) and later continental Europe	Unknown, possibly an unknown species of hantavirus	10,000+	
1489 Spain typhus epidemic	1489	Spain	Typhus	17,000	

=== 1500s ===
Chronological table of epidemic and pandemic events that started in the 1500s
Event	Years	Location	Disease	Death toll (estimate)	Ref.
1510 influenza pandemic	1510	Asia, North Africa, Europe	Influenza	Unknown, around 1% of those infected	
1520 Mexico smallpox epidemic	1519–1520	Mexico	Smallpox	5–8 million (40% of population)	
Cocoliztli epidemic of 1545–1548	1545–1548	Mexico	Possibly Salmonella enterica	5–15 million (80% of population)	
1557 influenza pandemic	1557–1559	Asia, Africa, Europe, and Americas	Influenza	Unknown (10% of the infected)	
1561 Chile smallpox epidemic	1561–1562	Chile	Smallpox	120,000–150,000 (20–25% of native population)	
1563 London plague (part of the second plague pandemic)	1563–1564	London, England	Bubonic plague	20,100+	
Cocoliztli epidemic of 1576	1576–1580	Mexico	Possibly Salmonella enterica	2–2.5 million (50% of population)	
1582 Tenerife plague epidemic (part of the second plague pandemic)	1582–1583	Tenerife, Spain	Bubonic plague	5,000–9,000	
1592–1596 Seneca nation measles epidemic	1592–1596	Seneca nation, North America	Measles	?	
1592–1593 Malta plague epidemic (part of the second plague pandemic)	1592–1593	Malta	Bubonic plague	3,000	
1592–1593 London plague (part of the second plague pandemic)	1592–1593	London, England	Bubonic plague	19,900+	
1596–1602 Spain plague epidemic (part of the second plague pandemic)	1596–1602	Spain	Bubonic plague	600,000–700,000	

=== 1600s ===
Chronological table of epidemic and pandemic events that started in the 1600s
Event	Years	Location	Disease	Death toll (estimate)	Ref.
1603 London plague (part of the second plague pandemic)	1603	London, England	Bubonic plague	40,000	
1616 New England infections epidemic	1616–1620	Southern New England, British North America, especially the Wampanoag people	Unknown, possibly leptospirosis with Weil syndrome. Classic explanations include yellow fever, bubonic plague, influenza, smallpox, chickenpox, typhus, and syndemic infection of hepatitis B and hepatitis D	1,143–3,429 (estimated 30–90% of population)	
1629–1631 Italian plague (part of the second plague pandemic)	1629–1631	Italy	Bubonic plague	1,000,000	
1632–1635 Augsburg plague epidemic (part of the second plague pandemic)	1632–1635	Augsburg, Germany	Bubonic plague	13,712	
Massachusetts smallpox epidemic	1633–1634	Massachusetts Bay Colony, Thirteen Colonies	Smallpox	1,000	
1634–1640 Wyandot people epidemic	1634–1640	Wyandot people, North America	Smallpox and Influenza	15,000–25,000	
1637 London plague epidemic (part of the second plague pandemic)	1636–1637	London and Westminster, England	Bubonic plague	10,400	
Great Plague in the late Ming dynasty (part of the second plague pandemic)	1633–1644	China	Bubonic plague	200,000+	
Great Plague of Seville (part of the second plague pandemic)	1647–1652	Spain	Bubonic plague	500,000	
1648 Central America yellow fever epidemic	1648	Central America	Yellow fever	?	
Naples Plague (part of the second plague pandemic)	1656–1658	Italy	Bubonic plague	1,250,000	
1663–1664 Amsterdam plague epidemic (part of the second plague pandemic)	1663–1664	Amsterdam, Netherlands	Bubonic plague	24,148	
Great Plague of London (part of the second plague pandemic)	1665–1666	England	Bubonic plague	100,000	
1668 France plague (part of the second plague pandemic)	1668	France	Bubonic plague	40,000	
1675–1676 Malta plague epidemic (part of the second plague pandemic)	1675–1676	Malta	Bubonic plague	11,300	
1676–1685 Spain plague (part of the second plague pandemic)	1676–1685	Spain	Bubonic plague	?	
1677–1678 Boston smallpox epidemic	1677–1678	Massachusetts Bay Colony, British North America	Smallpox	750–1,000	
Great Plague of Vienna (part of the second plague pandemic)	1679	Vienna, Austria	Bubonic plague	76,000	
1681 Prague plague epidemic (part of the second plague pandemic)	1681	Prague, Czech Kingdom	Bubonic plague	83,000	
1687 South Africa influenza outbreak	1687	South Africa	Unknown, possibly influenza	?	
1693 Boston yellow fever epidemic	1693	Boston, Massachusetts Bay Colony, British North America	Yellow fever	3,100+	
1699 Charleston and Philadelphia yellow fever epidemic	1699	Charleston and Philadelphia, British North America	Yellow fever	520 (300 in Charleston, 220 in Philadelphia)	

=== 1700s ===
Chronological table of epidemic and pandemic events that started in the 1700s
Event	Years	Location	Disease	Death toll (estimate)	Ref.
1702 New York City yellow fever epidemic	1702	New York City, British North America	Yellow fever	500	
1702–1703 St. Lawrence Valley smallpox epidemic	1702–1703	New France, Canada	Smallpox	1,300	
1707–1708 Iceland smallpox epidemic	1707–1709	Iceland	Smallpox	18,000+ (36% of population)	
Great Northern War plague outbreak (part of the second plague pandemic)	1710–1712	Denmark, Sweden, Lithuania	Bubonic plague	164,000	
1713–1715 North America measles epidemic	1713–1715	Thirteen Colonies and New France, Canada	Measles	?	
Great Plague of Marseille (part of the second plague pandemic)	1720–1722	France	Bubonic plague	100,000+	
1721 Boston smallpox outbreak	1721–1722	Massachusetts Bay Colony	Smallpox	844	
1730 Cádiz yellow fever epidemic	1730	Cádiz, Spain	Yellow fever	2,200	
1732–1733 Thirteen Colonies influenza epidemic	1732–1733	Thirteen Colonies	Influenza	?	
1733 New France smallpox epidemic	1733	New France, Canada	Smallpox	?	
1735–1741 diphtheria epidemic	1735–1741	New England, Province of New York, Province of New Jersey, British North America	Diphtheria	20,000	
Great Plague of 1738 (part of the second plague pandemic)	1738	Balkans	Bubonic plague	50,000	
1738–1739 North Carolina smallpox epidemic	1738–1739	Province of Carolina, Thirteen Colonies	Smallpox	7,700–11,700	
1741 Cartagena yellow fever epidemic	1741	Cartagena, Colombia	Yellow fever	20,000	
1743 Sicily plague epidemic (part of the second plague pandemic)	1743	Messina, Sicily, Italy	Bubonic plague	40,000–50,000	
1759 North America measles outbreak	1759	North America	Measles	?	
1760 Charleston smallpox epidemic	1760	Charleston, British North America	Smallpox	730–940	
1762 Havana yellow fever epidemic	1762	Havana, Cuba	Yellow fever	8,000	
1763 Pittsburgh area smallpox outbreak	1763	North America, present-day Pittsburgh area	Smallpox	?	
1770–1772 Russian plague (part of the second plague pandemic)	1770–1772	Russia	Bubonic plague	50,000	
1772 North America measles epidemic	1772	North America	Measles	1,080	
1772–1773 Persian Plague (part of the second plague pandemic)	1772–1773	Persia	Bubonic plague	2 million	
1775–1776 England influenza outbreak	1775–1776	England	Influenza	?	
1775–1782 North American smallpox epidemic	1775–1782	Native populations in what is now the Pacific Northwest of the United States	Smallpox	11,000+	
1778 Spain dengue fever outbreak	1778	Spain	Dengue fever	?	
1782 Influenza pandemic	1782	Worldwide	Influenza	?	
1788 Pueblo Indians smallpox epidemic	1788	Pueblo Indians in northern New Spain (what is now the Southwestern United States)	Smallpox	?	
1789–1790 New South Wales smallpox epidemic	1789–1790	New South Wales, Australia	Smallpox	125,251–175,351 (50–70% of native population)	
1793 Philadelphia yellow fever epidemic	1793	Philadelphia, United States	Yellow fever	5,000+	

=== 1800s ===
Chronological table of epidemic and pandemic events that started in the 1800s
Event	Years	Location	Disease	Death toll (estimate)	Ref.
1800–1803 Spain yellow fever epidemic	1800–1803	Spain	Yellow fever	60,000+	
1801 Ottoman Empire and Egypt bubonic plague epidemic	1801	Ottoman Empire, Egypt	Bubonic plague	?	
1802–1803 Saint-Domingue yellow fever epidemic	1802–1803	Saint-Domingue	Yellow fever	29,000–55,000	
1812 Russia typhus epidemic	1812	Russia	Typhus	300,000	
1812–1819 Ottoman plague epidemic (part of the second plague pandemic)	1812–1819	Ottoman Empire	Bubonic plague	300,000+	
1813–1814 Malta plague epidemic (part of the second plague pandemic)	1813–1814	Malta	Bubonic plague	4,500	
Caragea's plague (part of the second plague pandemic)	1813	Romania	Bubonic plague	60,000	
1817–1819 Ireland typhus epidemic	1817–1819	Ireland	Typhus	65,000	
First cholera pandemic	1817–1824	Asia, Europe	Cholera	100,000+	
1820 Savannah yellow fever epidemic	1820	Savannah, Georgia, United States	Yellow fever	700	
1821 Barcelona yellow fever epidemic	1821	Barcelona, Spain	Yellow fever	5,000–20,000	
Second cholera pandemic	1826–1837	Asia, Europe, North America	Cholera	100,000+	
1828–1829 New South Wales smallpox epidemic	1828–1829	New South Wales, Australia	Smallpox	19,000	
Groningen epidemic	1829	Netherlands	Malaria	2,800	
1829–1833 Pacific Northwest malaria epidemic	1829–1833	Pacific Northwest, United States	Malaria, possibly other diseases too	150,000	
1829–1835 Iran plague outbreak	1829–1835	Iran	Bubonic plague	?	
1834–1836 Egypt plague epidemic	1834–1836	Egypt	Bubonic plague	?	
1837 Great Plains smallpox epidemic	1837–1838	Great Plains, United States and Canada	Smallpox	17,000+	
1841 Southern United States yellow fever epidemic	1841	Southern United States (especially Louisiana and Florida)	Yellow fever	3,498	
1847 North American typhus epidemic	1847–1848	Canada	Typhus	20,000+	
1847 Southern United States yellow fever epidemic	1847	Southern United States (especially New Orleans)	Yellow fever	3,400	
1847–1848 influenza epidemic	1847–1848	Worldwide	Influenza	?	
1848–1849 Hawaii epidemic of infections	1848–1849	Hawaiian Kingdom	Measles, whooping cough, dysentery and influenza	10,000	
1853 New Orleans yellow fever epidemic	1853	New Orleans, United States	Yellow fever	7,970	
Third cholera pandemic	1846–1860	Worldwide	Cholera	1 million+	
1853 Ottoman Empire plague epidemic	1853	Ottoman Empire	Bubonic plague	?	
1853 Copenhagen cholera outbreak	1853	Copenhagen, Denmark	Cholera	4,737	
1854 Broad Street cholera outbreak	1854	London, England	Cholera	616	
1855 Norfolk yellow fever epidemic	1855	Norfolk and Portsmouth, Virginia, United States	Yellow fever	3,000 (2,000 in Norfolk, 1,000 in Portsmouth)	
Third plague pandemic	1855–1960	Worldwide	Bubonic plague	12–15 million (India and China)	
1855–1857 Montevideo yellow fever epidemic	1855–1857	Montevideo, Uruguay	Yellow fever	3,400 (first wave; 900, second wave; 2,500)	
1857 Lisbon yellow fever epidemic	1857	Lisbon, Portugal	Yellow fever	6,000	
1857 Victoria smallpox epidemic	1857	Victoria, Australia	Smallpox	?	
1857–1859 Europe and the Americas influenza epidemic	1857–1859	Europe, North America, South America	Influenza	?	
1862 Pacific Northwest smallpox epidemic	1862–1863	Pacific Northwest, Canada and United States	Smallpox	20,000+	
1861–1865 United States typhoid fever epidemic	1861–1865	United States	Typhoid fever	80,000	
Fourth cholera pandemic	1863–1875	Middle East	Cholera	600,000	
1867 Sydney measles epidemic	1867	Sydney, Australia	Measles	748	
1871 Buenos Aires yellow fever epidemic	1871	Buenos Aires, Argentina	Yellow fever	13,500–26,200	
Peru Oroya Fever Epidemic	1871	Mainly in Peru	Carrion disease	8,000	
1870–1875 Europe smallpox epidemic	1870–1875	Europe	Smallpox	500,000	
1875 Fiji measles outbreak	1875	Fiji	Measles	40,000	
1875–1876 Australia scarlet fever epidemic	1875–1876	Australia	Scarlet fever	8,000	
1876 Ottoman Empire plague epidemic	1876	Ottoman Empire	Bubonic plague	20,000	
1878 New Orleans yellow fever epidemic	1878	New Orleans, United States	Yellow fever	4,046	
1878 Mississippi Valley yellow fever epidemic	1878	Mississippi Valley, United States	Yellow fever	13,000	
Fifth cholera pandemic	1881–1896	Asia, Africa, Europe, South America	Cholera	298,600	
1885 Montreal smallpox epidemic	1885	Montreal, Canada	Smallpox	3,164	
1889–1890 pandemic	1889–1890	Worldwide	Influenza or Human coronavirus OC43 / HCoV-OC43 (disputed)	1 million	
1891-1910 Western Australia typhoid epidemic	1891-1910	Western Australia	Typhoid fever	1,879+	
1894 Hong Kong plague (part of the third plague pandemic)	1894–1929	Hong Kong	Bubonic plague	20,000+	
Bombay plague epidemic (part of the third plague pandemic)	1896–1905	Bombay, India	Bubonic plague	20,788	
1896–1906 Congo Basin African trypanosomiasis epidemic	1896–1906	Congo Basin	African trypanosomiasis	500,000	
1899 Porto plague outbreak (part of the third plague pandemic)	1899	Porto, Portugal	Bubonic plague	132	
Sixth cholera pandemic	1899–1923	Europe, Asia, Africa	Cholera	800,000+	

=== 1900s ===
Chronological table of epidemic and pandemic events that started in the 1900s
Event	Years	Location	Disease	Death toll (estimate)	Ref.
San Francisco plague of 1900–1904 (part of the third plague pandemic)	1900–1904	San Francisco, United States	Bubonic plague	119	
1900 Sydney bubonic plague epidemic (part of the third plague pandemic)	1900	Australia	Bubonic plague	103	
1900–1920 Uganda African trypanosomiasis epidemic	1900–1920	Uganda	African trypanosomiasis	200,000–300,000	
Papua New Guinea kuru epidemic	1901–2009	Papua New Guinea	Kuru	2,700–3,000+	
Peru Bubonic Plague 1903–1930 (part of the third plague pandemic)	1903–1930	Peru	Bubonic plague	10,000+	
1903 Fremantle plague epidemic (part of the third plague pandemic)	1903	Fremantle, Western Australia	Bubonic plague	4	
1906 malaria outbreak in Ceylon	1906–1936	Ceylon	Malaria	80,000	
Manchurian plague (part of the third plague pandemic)	1910–1911	China	Pneumonic plague	60,000	
1916 United States polio epidemic	1916	United States	Poliomyelitis	7,130	
1918 influenza pandemic ('Spanish flu')	1918–1920	Worldwide	Influenza A virus subtype H1N1	17–100 million	
1918–1922 Russia typhus epidemic	1918–1922	Russia	Typhus	2–3 million	
1919–1930 encephalitis lethargica epidemic	1919–1930	Worldwide	Encephalitis lethargica	500,000	
Duwaimeh smallpox epidemic	1921–1922	Duwaimeh, Mandatory Palestine	Smallpox	16	
1924 Los Angeles pneumonic plague outbreak	1924	Los Angeles, United States	Pneumonic plague	30	
1924–1925 Minnesota smallpox epidemic	1924–1925	Minnesota, United States	Smallpox	500	
1927 Montreal typhoid fever epidemic	1927	Montreal, Canada	Typhoid fever	538	
1929–1930 psittacosis pandemic	1929–1930	Worldwide	Psittacosis	100+	
1937 Croydon typhoid outbreak	1937	Croydon, United Kingdom	Typhoid fever	43	
1937 Australia polio epidemic	1937	Australia	Poliomyelitis	?	
1938 South Africa bubonic plague	1938	South Africa	Bubonic plague	?	
1940 Sudan yellow fever epidemic	1940	Sudan	Yellow fever	1,627	
1942–1944 Egypt malaria epidemic	1942–1944	Egypt	Malaria	?	
1946 Egypt relapsing fever epidemic	1946	Egypt	Relapsing fever	?	
1947 Egypt cholera epidemic	1947	Egypt	Cholera	10,277	
1948–1952 United States polio epidemic	1948–1952	United States	Poliomyelitis	9,000	
1957–1958 influenza pandemic ('Asian flu')	1957–1958	Worldwide	Influenza A virus subtype H2N2	1–4 million	
1960–1962 Ethiopia yellow fever epidemic	1960–1962	Ethiopia	Yellow fever	30,000	
1963 Wrocław smallpox epidemic	1963	Wrocław, Poland	Smallpox	7	
Hong Kong flu	1968–1970	Worldwide	Influenza A virus subtype H3N2	1–4 million	
1971 Staphorst polio epidemic	1971	Staphorst, Netherlands	Poliomyelitis	5	
1972 Yugoslav smallpox outbreak	1972	Yugoslavia	Smallpox	35	
London flu	1972–1973	United States	Influenza A virus subtype H3N2	1,027	
1973 Italy cholera epidemic	1973	Italy	Cholera (El Tor strain)	24	
1974 smallpox epidemic in India	1974	India	Smallpox	15,000	
1977 Russian flu	1977–1979	Worldwide	Influenza A virus subtype H1N1	700,000	
Sverdlovsk anthrax leak	1979	Russia	Anthrax	105	
1986 Oju yellow fever epidemic	1986	Oju, Nigeria	Yellow fever	5,600+	
1987 Mali yellow fever epidemic	1987	Mali	Yellow fever	145	
1988 Shanghai hepatitis A epidemic	1988	Shanghai, China	Hepatitis A	31–47	
1991 Bangladesh cholera epidemic	1991	Bangladesh	Cholera	8,410–9,432	
1991 Latin America cholera epidemic	1991–1993	Peru, Chile, Bolivia, Ecuador, Colombia, Mexico, El Salvador, Guatemala	Cholera	8,000	
1994 plague in India	1994	India	Bubonic plague and Pneumonic plague	56	
United Kingdom BSE outbreak	1996–2001	United Kingdom	Variant Creutzfeldt–Jakob disease / vCJD	178	
1996 West Africa meningitis epidemic	1996	West Africa	Meningitis	10,000	
1998–1999 Malaysia Nipah virus outbreak	1998–1999	Malaysia	Nipah virus infection	105	
1998–2000 Democratic Republic of the Congo Marburg virus outbreak	1998–2000	Democratic Republic of the Congo	Marburg virus	128	

=== 2000s ===
Chronological table of epidemic and pandemic events that started in the 2000s
Event	Years	Location	Disease	Death toll (estimate)	Ref.
2000 Central America dengue epidemic	2000	Central America	Dengue fever	40+	
2001 Nigeria cholera epidemic	2001	Nigeria	Cholera	400+	
2001 South Africa cholera epidemic	2001	South Africa	Cholera	139	
2002–2004 SARS outbreak	2002–2004	Worldwide	Severe acute respiratory syndrome / SARS	774	
2003–2019 Asia and Egypt avian influenza epidemic	2003–2019	China, Southeast Asia and Egypt	Influenza A virus subtype H5N1	455	
2004 Indonesia dengue epidemic	2004	Indonesia	Dengue fever	658	
2004 Sudan Ebola outbreak	2004	Sudan	Ebola	7	
2004–2005 Angola Marburg virus outbreak	2004–2005	Angola	Marburg virus	227	
2005 dengue outbreak in Singapore	2005	Singapore	Dengue fever	27	
2006 Luanda cholera epidemic	2006	Luanda, Angola	Cholera	1,200+	
2006 Ituri Province plague epidemic	2006	Ituri Province, Democratic Republic of the Congo	Bubonic plague	61	
2006 India malaria outbreak	2006	India	Malaria	17	
2006 dengue outbreak in India	2006	India	Dengue fever	50+	
2006 dengue outbreak in Pakistan	2006	Pakistan	Dengue fever	50+	
2006 Philippines dengue epidemic	2006	Philippines	Dengue fever	1,000	
2006–2007 East Africa Rift Valley fever outbreak	2006–2007	East Africa	Rift Valley fever	394	
Mweka Ebola epidemic	2007	Democratic Republic of the Congo	Ebola	187	
2007 Ethiopia cholera epidemic	2007	Ethiopia	Cholera	684	
2007 Iraq cholera outbreak	2007	Iraq	Cholera	10	
2007 Puerto Rico, Dominican Republic, and Mexico dengue fever epidemic	2007	Puerto Rico, Dominican Republic, Mexico	Dengue fever	183	
2007 Uganda Ebola outbreak	2007	Uganda	Ebola	37	
2007 Netherlands Q-fever epidemic	2007–2018	Netherlands	Q-fever	95	
2008 Brazil dengue epidemic	2008	Brazil	Dengue fever	67	
2008 Cambodia dengue epidemic	2008	Cambodia	Dengue fever	407	
2008 Chad cholera epidemic	2008	Chad	Cholera	123	
2008–2017 China hand, foot, and mouth disease epidemic	2008–2017	China	Hand, foot, and mouth disease	3,322+	
2008 India cholera epidemic	2008	India	Cholera	115	
2008 Madagascar plague outbreak	2008	Madagascar	Bubonic plague	18+	
2008 Philippines dengue epidemic	2008	Philippines	Dengue fever	172	
2008 Zimbabwean cholera outbreak	2008–2009	Zimbabwe	Cholera	4,293	
2009 Bolivian dengue fever epidemic	2009	Bolivia	Dengue fever	18	
2009 Gujarat hepatitis outbreak	2009	India	Hepatitis B	49	
Queensland 2009 dengue outbreak	2009	Queensland, Australia	Dengue fever	1+ (503 cases)	
2009–2010 West African meningitis outbreak	2009–2010	West Africa	Meningococcal disease, Pneumococcal (secondary, Burkina Faso)	1,100	
2009 swine flu pandemic	2009–2010	Worldwide	Pandemic H1N1/09 virus	18,449 (Lab confirmed deaths, reported to the WHO)	
2009 swine flu pandemic	2009–2010	Worldwide	Pandemic H1N1/09 virus	284,000 (possible range 151,700–575,400)	
2010s Haiti cholera outbreak	2010–2019	Haiti	Cholera (strain serogroup O1, serotype Ogawa)	10,075	
2010–2014 Democratic Republic of the Congo measles outbreak	2010–2014	Democratic Republic of the Congo	Measles	4,500+	
2011 Vietnam hand, foot, and mouth disease epidemic	2011	Vietnam	Hand, foot, and mouth disease	170	
2011 dengue outbreak in Pakistan	2011	Pakistan	Dengue fever	350+	
2012 yellow fever outbreak in Darfur, Sudan	2012	Darfur, Sudan	Yellow fever	171	
2013 dengue outbreak in Singapore	2013	Singapore	Dengue fever	8	
2013 swine flu outbreak in Peru	2013	Peru	Swine influenza	120	
2013 Vietnam measles outbreak	2013–2014	Vietnam	Measles	142	
Western African Ebola virus epidemic	2013–2016	Worldwide, primarily concentrated in Guinea, Liberia, Sierra Leone	Ebola	11,323+	
2013–2014 chikungunya outbreak	2013–2015	Americas	Chikungunya	183	
2013–19 avian influenza epidemic	2013–2019	China	Influenza A virus subtype H7N9	616	
21st century Madagascar plague outbreaks	2014–2017	Madagascar	Bubonic plague and Pneumonic plague	292	
Flint water crisis	2014–2015	Flint, Michigan, United States	Legionnaires' disease	12	
2014 Odisha hepatitis outbreak	2014–2015	India	Primarily Hepatitis E, but also Hepatitis A	36	
2015 Indian swine flu outbreak	2015	India	Influenza A virus subtype H1N1	2,035	
2015–16 Zika virus epidemic	2015–2016	Worldwide	Zika virus	53	
2016 Angola and Democratic Republic of the Congo yellow fever outbreak	2016	Angola and Democratic Republic of the Congo	Yellow fever	498 (377 in Angola, 121 in Congo)	
2016–2022 Yemen cholera outbreak	2016–2023	Yemen	Cholera	4,004 (as of June 11, 2023)	
2017 Nigeria Lassa fever epidemic	2017–2023	Nigeria	Lassa fever	1,103 (as of April 2023)	
2017 dengue outbreak in Peshawar	2017	Peshawar, Pakistan	Dengue fever	69	
2017 Gorakhpur hospital deaths	2017	India	Japanese encephalitis	1,317	
2017 dengue outbreak in Sri Lanka	2017	Sri Lanka	Dengue fever	440	
2018 Nipah virus outbreak in Kerala	2018	India	Nipah virus infection	17	
Kivu Ebola epidemic	2018–2020	Democratic Republic of the Congo and Uganda	Ebola	2,280	
2018 NDM-CRE outbreak in Italy	2018–2019	Italy	New Delhi metallo-beta-lactamase-producing Carbapenem-resistant enterobacteriaceae	31 (as of September 2019)	
2019–2023 Guillain-Barré Syndrome Outbreak in Peru	2019–2023	Peru	Guillain-Barré Syndrome	12	
2019–2020 measles outbreak in the Democratic Republic of the Congo	2019–2020	Democratic Republic of the Congo	Measles	7,018+	
2019–2020 New Zealand measles outbreak	2019–2020	New Zealand	Measles	2	
2019 measles outbreak in the Philippines	2019	Philippines	Measles	415	
2019 Kuala Koh measles outbreak	2019	Kuala Koh, Malaysia	Measles	15	
2019 Samoa measles outbreak	2019	Samoa	Measles	83	
2019–2020 dengue fever epidemic	2019–2020	Asia-Pacific, Latin America	Dengue fever	3,931	
2020 Democratic Republic of the Congo Ebola outbreak	2020	Democratic Republic of the Congo	Ebola	55	
2020 dengue outbreak in Singapore	2020	Singapore	Dengue fever	32	
2020 Nigeria yellow fever epidemic	2020	Nigeria	Yellow fever	296 (as of 31 December 2020)	
2021 South Sudan disease outbreak	2021	South Sudan	Unknown	97 (as of December 2021)	
2021 India black fungus epidemic	2021–2022	India	Black fungus (COVID-19 condition)	4,332	
2022 hepatitis of unknown origin in children	2021–2022	Worldwide	Hepatitis by Adenovirus variant AF41 (Unconfirmed)	18	
2022–2024 Southern Africa cholera outbreak	2022–2026	Africa	Cholera	12,121+	
2022–2023 mpox outbreak	2022–2023	Worldwide	Mpox	280	
2022 Uganda Ebola outbreak	2022–2023	Uganda	Sudan ebolavirus	77	
2023–2024 Zambian cholera outbreak (part of the 2022–2024 Southern Africa cholera outbreak)	2023–2024	Zambia	Cholera	685	
2023 South Poland Legionellosis outbreak	2023	Poland	Legionnaires' disease	41	
2023–2024 Bangsamoro measles outbreak	2023–2024	Bangsamoro, Philippines	Measles	14	
2023–2024 Oropouche virus disease outbreak	2023–2024	Brazil	Oropouche fever	2	
2024-2026 American dengue epidemic	2024–2026	Latin America and the Caribbean	Dengue fever	10,491	
2024 Kwango province malaria outbreak	2024	Democratic Republic of the Congo	Malaria	143	
MV Hondius hantavirus outbreak	2026	MV Hondius	Hantavirus pulmonary syndrome	3	
2026 United States cyclosporiasis outbreak	2026	United States	Cyclosporiasis	2	

=== Ongoing ===
Chronological table of ongoing epidemic, endemic and pandemic events
Event	Years	Location	Disease	Death toll (estimate)	Ref.
Seventh cholera pandemic	1961–present	Worldwide	Cholera (El Tor strain)	1.4-9.3 million; 21,000–143,000 each year (as of 2026)	
HIV/AIDS pandemic	1981–present	Worldwide	HIV/AIDS	45 million (as of 2026)	
MERS outbreak	2012–present	Worldwide, mainly in Saudi Arabia	Middle East respiratory syndrome / MERS-CoV	965 (as of 5 October 2026)	
COVID-19 pandemic	2019–present	Worldwide	COVID-19	7.12–38 million (as of 2026)	
2023–2026 mpox epidemic	2023–present	Worldwide, primarily Africa	Mpox	812	
2024–2026 Sudanese cholera epidemic	2024–present	Sudan, South Sudan, and Chad	Cholera	3,573	
2026 Bangladesh measles outbreak	2026–present	Bangladesh	Measles	1,272	
2026 Ebola epidemic	2026–present	Democratic Republic of the Congo, Uganda,Kenya, Nigeria, France	Ebola	5,572	

== See also ==
- Globalization and disease
- History of smallpox
- List of infectious diseases
- List of natural disasters by death toll#Deadliest epidemics
- Timeline of plague – Human and animal disease
- History of public health in the United Kingdom
- History of public health in the United States
