= 2019 dengue outbreak in Pakistan =

Disease outbreak in Pakistan

- Disease: Dengue fever
- Pathogen: Dengue virus
- First outbreak: Pakistan
- Dates: July 2019 – December 2019
- Confirmed cases: 52,485
- Deaths: 91

In Pakistan, in the summer of 2019, more than 47 people died and over 30,000 were infected by dengue fever.

In October, the Prime Minister and sought report from his Special Assistant on National Health Services regarding the dengue outbreak in the country.

On 10 October 2019, a Peshawar High Court bench sent summons to the Khyber Pakhtunkhwa's provincial health secretary to explain the situation related to dengue outbreak in parts of the province.

As of November 2019, record 44,000 cases were reported in the country with 67 deaths. In December the death toll risen to 91 with total number of cases on 52,485.

== See also ==
- 2011 dengue outbreak in Pakistan
- 2017 dengue outbreak in Peshawar
