= Black Death in Portugal =

Spread of the Black Death in Europe, 1346 - 1353

In 1348, around April or May, the bubonic plague, or Black Death pandemic, reached Portugal. By late spring or early summer, the first case was reported in Lisbon, and by late August the plague had reached the town of Alenquer. The pandemic likely reached its peak in autumn of 1348, and had largely subsided by 1349. By one estimate, between 20 and 35 percent of Portugal's inhabitants died as the disease spread through the country, similar to the mortality rate seen in Benelux and Central Europe.

== Background ==
Before the pandemic, Europe's population totaled roughly 73.5 million, of which around 6 million lived in Spain and 900,000 lived in Portugal. The largest Portuguese cities in 1300 were as follows:

City	Population (1300)
Lisbon	35,000
Évora	12,000
Chaves	8,000
Santarém	7,000
Vila Nova de Gaia	7,000
Coimbra	6,000
Elvas	6,000
Porto	6,000
Aveiro	5,000
Lamego	5,000
Tavira	5,000
Total	102,000

In 1300, approximately 14.5% of Portugal's population lived in cities with at least 5,000 inhabitants, a higher percentage than the Netherlands (13.8%), but a lower proportion compared to Belgium, Spain and Italy, which had over 20% of their residents living in urban centers with at least 5,000 people.

At the time of the Black Death, Portugal was ruled by Afonso IV, who had ascended to the throne after the death of his father, Denis I, in 1325. Portugal was in a period of relative prosperity, characterized by a rapidly growing population and expanding farmland. However, this prosperity would come to a halt with the arrival of plague.

== Spread ==
It is not known exactly how the bubonic plague entered Portugal. However, there are multiple theories. The Black Death could have arrived at Portugal via Galicia, where the port of A Coruña was contaminated some time around April of 1348. From A Coruña, the plague would have quickly made its way down south, eventually reaching the border city of Tui. The pandemic might have promptly spread to the Portuguese town of Valença, which sat across from and was heavily influenced by Tui. Then, according to the theory, the plague would have gone southward, quickly contaminating the rest of Portugal. Another possibility is that the Black Death spread to Portugal via maritime trade routes to major ports such as Porto and Lisbon. From there, the pandemic would have infected other prominent Portuguese seaports, eventually reaching the cities and towns inland through the roads that connected them. In addition,

== Consequences ==
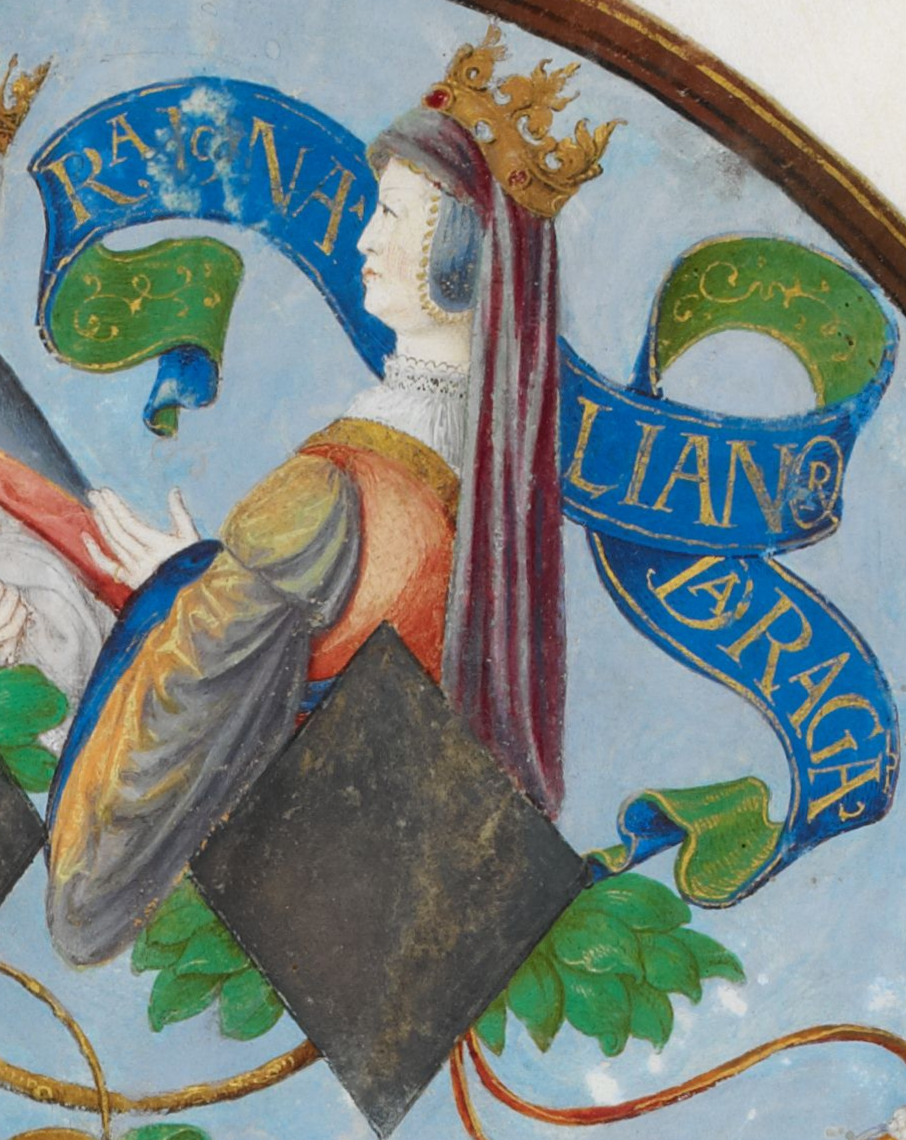
Eleanor of Portugal, Aragonese queen born in Coimbra who succumbed to the Black Death while traveling in Spain

There are various estimates of the mortality rate of the Black Death in Portugal, generally ranging from 20 to 50 percent, although some contemporary Portuguese documents claim mortality rates of two-thirds, with one even estimating 90 percent of people died. Portugal's pre-plague population did not recover until around 1500. It is known that, in Torres Vedras, 38 percent of members of the collegiate church perished due to pestilence. In addition, five-eights of the public notaries in the town perished, the same proportion as in Sintra, but a lower rate compared to Braga and Guimarães, where 3 in 4 notaries died to plague. Below are mortality estimates for ten Portuguese cities and towns during the Black Death:

City	Mortality (%)	Ref.
Braga	45 - 50%	
Bragança	50%	
Buarcos	80%	
Caminha	50%	
Coimbra	50%	
Évora	35%	
Figueira da Foz	80%	
Lisbon	50%	
Santarém	66%	
Silves	80%	

== Recurrences ==
One of the first major plague epidemics in Portugal after the Black Death was in 1432. Initially beginning in Lisbon, the pestilence then spread to the rest of Portugal as many residents fled the city. In 1569 and 1570, a plague outbreak in Lisbon claimed 60,000 lives, out of the city's 120,000 inhabitants at the time. Between 1579 and 1583 another deadly outbreak of the bubonic plague ravaged Portugal, resulting in the deaths of more than 40,000 people in Lisbon and roughly 25,000 residents of Évora. Slightly less than two decades later, from the years 1598 to 1603, another epidemic of pestilence struck Portugal. One of the last plague recurrences was in Porto, in 1899, where there were 320 infections and 132 deaths, a case-fatality rate of approximately 41 percent.

== See also ==
- 1899 Porto plague outbreak
