= Mortality in the early modern period =

Death rates in the early modern period

The early modern age saw various economic changes as well as several significant diseases that have affected mortality rates. Data collection during this time was not consistent or broadly recorded and there have been efforts to reconstruct plausible statistics. Mortality rates vary on geographic location, social environment, and cultural values. There were also gender differences in the mortality rates, leading to an excess mortality rate in urban areas and in the female population. A main cause of death was stillbirth, which could be attributed to, but not limited to, maternal infections, birth complications, and congenital anomalies. Another contributing factor to the mortality rate was food insecurity and shortages as well as unemployment, both of which varied per region. A final factor was violence, which occurred mainly due to structural or systemic violence; however, violence since the 12th century has been steadily falling.

== Data collection ==
Data from the early modern age was not accurately or consistently collected. However, there have been a number of studies and reconstructed statistics from this era, particularly on children and women. There has not been any empirical research published and the only information has been theoretical as there has been insufficient data and sources. It was also common for many statistics to go unreported; this is especially true regarding unmarried women. Models and theoretic equations need to take into account "social, economic, cultural, geographical, and even climatological variables" in order to accurately reflect the statistics of the time.

== Gender differences ==
One study, the Eurasia Project, has shown that boys, especially those under one year, had a higher mortality rate during childhood than girls, but the mortality rate for men and women were about equal. It has also been shown that there is a higher male mortality than female mortality rate during the time of famine. Male mortality has also been linked to "economic modernization and urbanization ... especially for cardiovascular disease".

Women faced increased mortality during childbirth as pregnancy and childbirth compromised the mother's immune system, with the most common causes of death being puerperal fever, toxemia, and hemorrhage. These dangers suggest an association to the excess female mortality, especially considering that women had to compete more for resources as they had no property rights and had a lower ranking in the household hierarchy. The average age of childbearing differed between Asia and Europe with an average difference of five years, which would affect cross-cultural data collection. Children born to mothers 35 years or older had a higher risk of mortality than children born to younger mothers. linking a mother's health and a child's survival.

Female infants and children often had a higher mortality rate, especially in times of food insecurity, compared to male infants and children. However, a maternal presence worked as a protective factor for children. regardless of age or gender.

== Economics ==
Food insecurity and shortages were common throughout this time period and were matched with the high food prices and high unemployment rate. This is shown through the differences in mortality rates between the lower and upper class, with poor infants being up to two times more likely to die than their wealthier counterparts. In 17th century Europe, it was common that at least one in five children from the same family would die before the age of one. Because of this high rate, it was common for there to be a large number of children in one family so that there would be a higher rate of survival. Especially among poorer families, having multiple children was common in order to ensure there would be children to contribute to the family later on.

During the early modern era, house calls were common. If the patient was female, the doctor, commonly an upper class male, would typically be summoned by a male family member who would remain throughout the examination. The physician and male family member would then discuss the diagnosis and treatment plan without the female's input. This practice reinforced and perpetuated social hierarchies and patriarchal values.

== Death and diseases ==
Food shortages and insecurity were leading concerns in the 18th century, especially in Europe, and these were exacerbated by reduced harvests yields. Disease was another leading cause of death, with rats and fleas being the common carriers of disease, specifically plagues, during this era.

The Black Death was a plague that affected much of the world, originating in Asia and spreading to Europe through diseased fleas and rats. This epidemic has been reported to have been the cause of death for approximately "60% of the European population".

During the end of the 19th century, there was a plague, known as the Modern Plague, that started in China and spread to different cities through ports, reportedly causing roughly ten million deaths. This plague affected Asia, the Americas, and Africa and lasted into the 20th century. There were also epidemics that occurred locally and did not spread to national levels, notably in 18th century England. These local epidemics included fevers, dysentery, smallpox, starvation, typhoid fever, under-nutrition, cholera, malaria.

By the end of the era, disease and malnutrition were no longer the main leading causes of death.
