= Chaim Raphael ben Asher =

Ottoman rabbi and Rishon LeZion (1714–1772)

- חיים_רפאל_בן_אשר
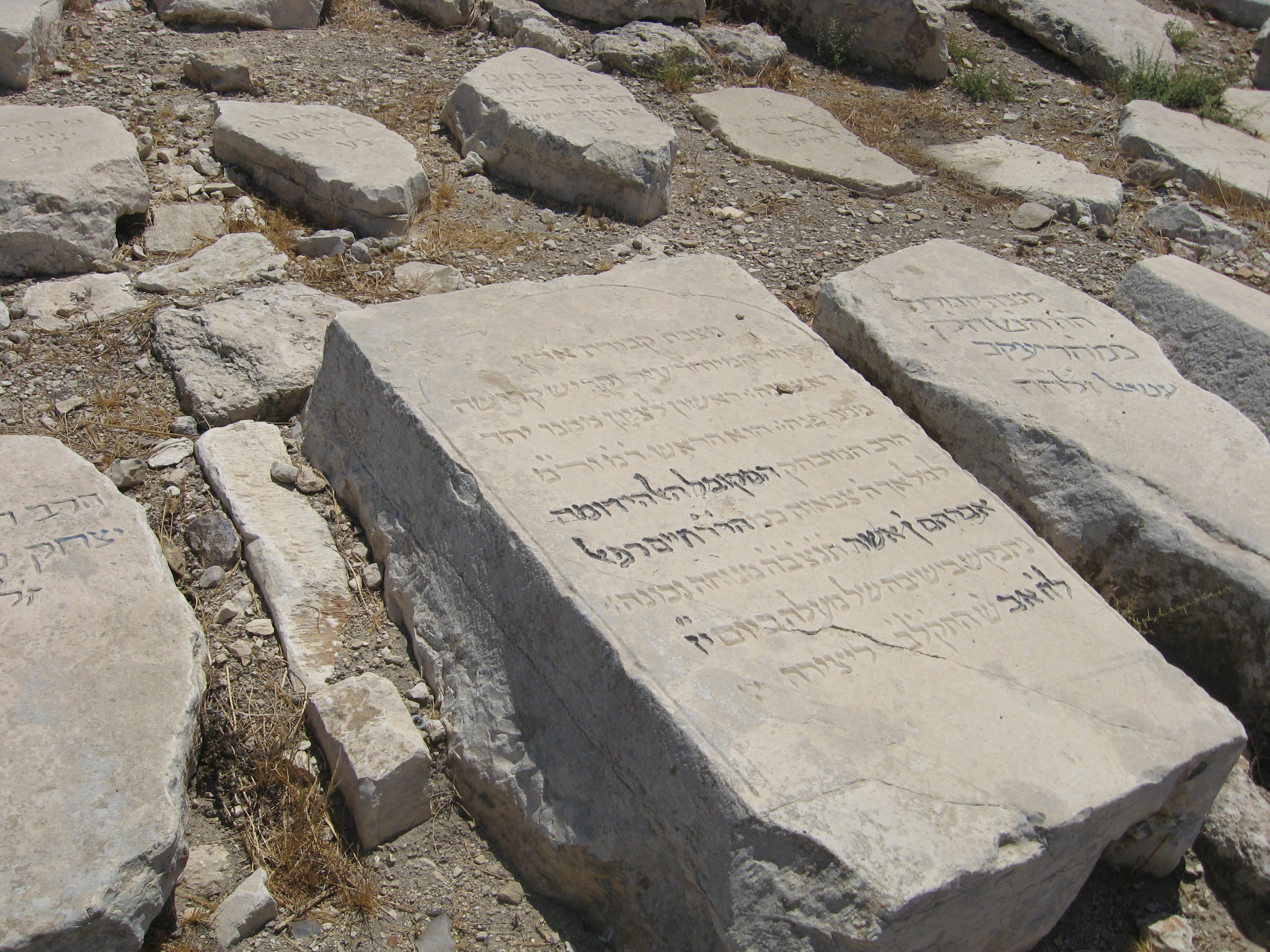
- ben Asher's gravestone

Rishon LeZion
- In office 1771 – August 16, 1772
- Preceded by: Nissim Chaim Moshe Mizrachi
- Succeeded by: Israel Yaakov Algazi

Personal life
- Born: 1714 Europe
- Died: August 16, 1772 (aged 57-58) Jerusalem, Ottoman Empire
- Cause of death: Bubonic plague
- Buried: Mount of Olives Jewish Cemetery

Religious life
- Religion: Judaism

Jewish leader
- Yahrtzeit: 17 Av

Rabbi Chaim Avraham Raphael ben Asher (1714 – August 16, 1772) was a Kabbalist and Sephardi Chief Rabbi of Israel in the 18th century during the Ottoman period. He was a famous rabbinical sage among his generation.

== Career ==
Although little is known about his early life, it is known that in 1734, ben Asher, who was born in Europe, immigrated to Jerusalem, and worked as a doctor. In the early 1740s, he spent several years in Smyrna, as well as other cities in Italy and France practicing medicine. In 1744, members of the Sephardi Franco family in Italy established the Yafar Anouim Yeshiva in Jerusalem, and ben Asher was elected its Rosh Yeshiva.

When he returned to Jerusalem in 1751, he became Av Beit Din by appointment under Rabbi Eliezer ben Yaakov Nachum and Nissim Chaim Moshe Mizrachi, who was the then-Rishon LeZion, and he signed off on several of their rulings. He signed the first deed of engagement of the Beit El Kabbalist Yeshiva. He was a devoted follower of the ways of the MaHaRaSH, and in the Toldot Gedolei Yisroel by Rabbi Girondi, it is noted that he conducted his life in a holy year dedicated to him. He also helped pass a ruling that prevented men from entering the city of Jerusalem without their wives present with them.

In the early 1760s, many Jews, including ben Asher, fled to Egypt, and returned to Jerusalem a few years later. In 1771, he was appointed Rishon LeZion, and served in the position for around one year.

== Personal life and death ==
In 1772, as part of the wider 1772–1773 Persian Plague, ben Asher became sick and died on August 16, one year into his position. He was buried in the Mount of Olives Jewish Cemetery. His tombstone reads:

Here lies the burial monument of one unique man, an institution and a holy man, the first holiness, Rishon LeZion, from which a pillar turned, is the head Reish Matyivta, the distinguished rabbi, the divinely accepted, similar to the angel of the Lord of hosts

Rabbi Chaim Raphael Avraham

May his rest be right...

His yahrzeit is commemorated on the 17th of Av.
