= The Last Great Plague of Colonial India =

2024 book by Natasha Sarkar

- Author: Natasha Sarkar
- Language: English
- Subject: History of medicine, colonial India
- Genre: History
- Publisher: Oxford University Press
- Publication date: 2024
- ISBN: 9780198873228

The Last Great Plague of Colonial India is a 2024 book by historian Natasha Sarkar about the third plague pandemic and its effects in colonial India. Published by Oxford University Press, the book examines the spread of bubonic plague and the responses to the epidemic by colonial authorities, medical practitioners, and Indian communities. It considers the political, social, economic, medical, and demographic dimensions of the plague epidemic. The book won the 2025 British in India Book Prize, which recognizes historical writing about British South Asia by first- or second-time authors.

== Subject ==
The Last Great Plague of Colonial India examines the third plague pandemic and its effects in colonial India in the late nineteenth and early twentieth centuries. The book traces the spread of bubonic plague and examines the responses to the epidemic by state and non-state actors, including medical practitioners and local communities. The book examines the relationship between colonial medicine and indigenous responses to plague. It considers Western biomedical approaches alongside Indian medical systems and examines how individuals and communities understood and responded to the disease and to measures introduced by colonial authorities. The book gives particular attention to Bombay as a centre of commerce and disease transmission. It also examines the effects of plague in rural Punjab and considers connections between India and other parts of the British Empire, including South Africa and Hong Kong. Archana Venkatesh noted the book's attention to both rural and urban plague centres, including Bombay and rural Punjab, as well as connections between India and other parts of the British Empire. The book uses vernacular newspapers and other vernacular sources alongside official scientific and governmental records. In the Journal of the Royal Asiatic Society, historian Mark Harrison noted the use of vernacular newspapers and discussed the book's account of popular responses to plague in Bombay, including the figure of Bhagirathi, a person who purported to heal plague sufferers.

== Publication ==
The book was published by Oxford University Press in 2024. The book contains an introduction and ten chapters: "Outbreak", "Colonial Designs", "Indigenous Response", "Remedies Aplenty", "Missionary Zeal", "Oh, Rats!", "Rethinking Spaces", "Shifting Priorities", "Mortality Estimates", and "Final Musings".

== Reception ==
Reviews have appeared in academic journals including The English Historical Review, the Journal of the Royal Asiatic Society, and History of Science in South Asia. Writing in The English Historical Review, Archana Venkatesh discussed the book's treatment of both urban and rural plague centres. She noted its focus on Bombay as a centre of commerce and contagion and its attention to rural Punjab, as well as to connections between India and other parts of the British Empire linked by trade and migration. Mark Harrison reviewed the book in the Journal of the Royal Asiatic Society. He noted its detailed treatment of the epidemic and its use of vernacular newspapers and other vernacular sources alongside official scientific and governmental records. Harrison also discussed the book's account of Bhagirathi, described as a person who purported to heal plague sufferers in Bombay and other affected cities. Saurav Kumar Rai reviewed the book in History of Science in South Asia in 2025. The review considers the book in relation to the history of medicine and health sciences in South Asia.

== Awards ==
The Last Great Plague of Colonial India won the 2025 British in India Book Prize. The prize recognizes historical writing about British South Asia by first- or second-time authors of books published in the preceding year. The 2025 prize was decided by a panel of three judges: Robert Ivermee, Rosie Llewellyn-Jones, and Adrian Steger. The book was also longlisted for the 2025 Karwaan Book Award.
