= 2023–2024 cholera outbreak in South Africa =

Cholera outbreak in South Africa

- Disease: Cholera
- Pathogen: Vibrio cholerae
- Location: South Africa
- Arrival date: January 29, 2023
- Suspected cases^{‡}: 1499 (or 1395)
- Deaths: 47
- Fatality rate: 3.4

On 1 February 2023, a cholera outbreak began in South Africa. As of 3 March 2024, 1395 cases had been reported.

== Background ==
The South African outbreak is thought to originate from two sisters that introduced it into the country after visiting Chinsapo (Lilongwe) in Malawi. The initial cases were isolated to Gauteng. As of 21 January 2024, 1499 (or 1395) new suspected cholera cases were reported across all 9 provinces.

== Timeline ==
The first cases of cholera were reported on 1 February 2023.

In May, the Gauteng province health department declared an outbreak in Hammanskraal. Fifteen deaths and 41 cases had been recorded as of May 22. Residents blamed the local government for failing to provide adequate potable water.

By July 10, nearly 50 deaths had been recorded, most of which occurred in Hammanskraal.

On 16 January 2024, the health ministry confirmed two cases through laboratory tests in Limpopo province.

== See also ==
- 2022-2024 Southern Africa cholera outbreak
- 2023–2024 Zambian cholera outbreak
- 2023–2024 Zimbabwe cholera outbreak
- 2024 mpox outbreak
