= 2014 Odisha hepatitis outbreak =

Disease outbreak in India

- Date: 2014–2015
- Location: Sambalpur, Odisha, India; 21.492042°N 83.984385°E
- Deaths: 36
- Injuries: 3,966+ infected

The 2014 Odisha hepatitis outbreak (initially known as the 2014 Sambalpur jaundice outbreak, in relation to the predominant symptom and location) was an outbreak of mainly Hepatitis E and also Hepatitis A which began in the town of Sambalpur in Odisha, India. The cause of the outbreak was suspected to be the contamination to drinking water supplied by the Public Health Engineering Department (PHED).

By February 2015, it had spread and cases were being reported from Bolangir district near Sambalpur, and some coastal districts like Cuttack, Khurda and Jajpur. The epidemic is still to be brought under control as of February 2015.

== Timeline ==
=== September 2014 ===
Following the monsoon floods, cases of jaundice and dengue were reported from Sambalpur. The increase in reported jaundice was attributed to broken water supply lines, into which drain water was seeping in.

=== November 2014 ===
In late November 2014, water samples were sent to National Institute of Virology, Pune. By this time, an average of 20 cases were being reported daily and 6 had died. A total of 677 cases had been reported.

=== December 2014 ===
A state government task force was formed to stop the outbreak. The 5 water samples sent to the National Institute of Virology were found negative. 50 more water samples were sent for testing. The PHED water supply to the worst affected areas was stopped. 818 persons had been infected by this time and 10 had died.

The Food Safety Officer of Sambalpur Municipality, Rudra Pratap, raided roadside food stalls on 3 December. He seized and destroyed more than 100 kg of unhygienic food being sold. A meeting of 250 food stall owners was conducted on 5 December by the city administration. They were instructed to observe various cleanliness standards. On 11 December 2014, the collector Balwant Singh announced that the local cultural festival, Sambalpur Lok Mahotsav, which was to be held from 4 January will be cancelled.

By 24 December, the number of infected had risen to 1,547 and 17 had died. It was speculated that a poor drainage system and damaged water supply pipes were causing the infections.

On 26 December, 88 blood samples were collected from admitted patients. 21 were found to contain the Hepatitis A virus and 4 Hepatitis E virus. On the same day, the town was visited by a team from central government, consisting of P Verma of National Centre for Disease Control (NCDC); Vidya Arankalle of National Institute of Virology, Pune and Manju of Indian Council of Medical Research (ICMR).

=== January 2015 ===
The Odisha High Court on 12 January 2015 asked the state government to submit a report on the steps taken to check the outbreak. On 21 January, Sambalpur district administration, Public Health department and Sambalpur Municipality filed affidavits at the court detailing the steps taken to check the outbreak.

On 17 January 2015, families of the dead and affected filed 450 police complaints against various public officials. They demanded that ₹100,000 should given as compensation to the family of the dead and ₹50,000 to the infected.

=== February 2015 ===
By 12 February 2015, responding to a Public Interest Litigation filed by a Corporator of Cuttack Municipal Corporation, Giribala Behera, the Odisha High Court directed the state government to form a high level committee to check the epidemic.

By 16 February 2015, the state had declared the districts Sambalpur, Bolangir, Cuttack, Khurda, and Jajpur as jaundice affected. By now Sambalpur had reported 2,945 and Cuttack had reported 116 cases, with there being total 3,966 cases from the state. The official death toll was 36 but unofficially it was estimated to be 50. A separate ward was set up in Shri Ramachandra Bhanj Medical College, Cuttack to treat the victims.

== See also ==
- List of epidemics
