= 2023–2024 Zimbabwe cholera outbreak =

Disease outbreak in Zimbabwe

2023–2024 Zimbabwean cholera outbreak
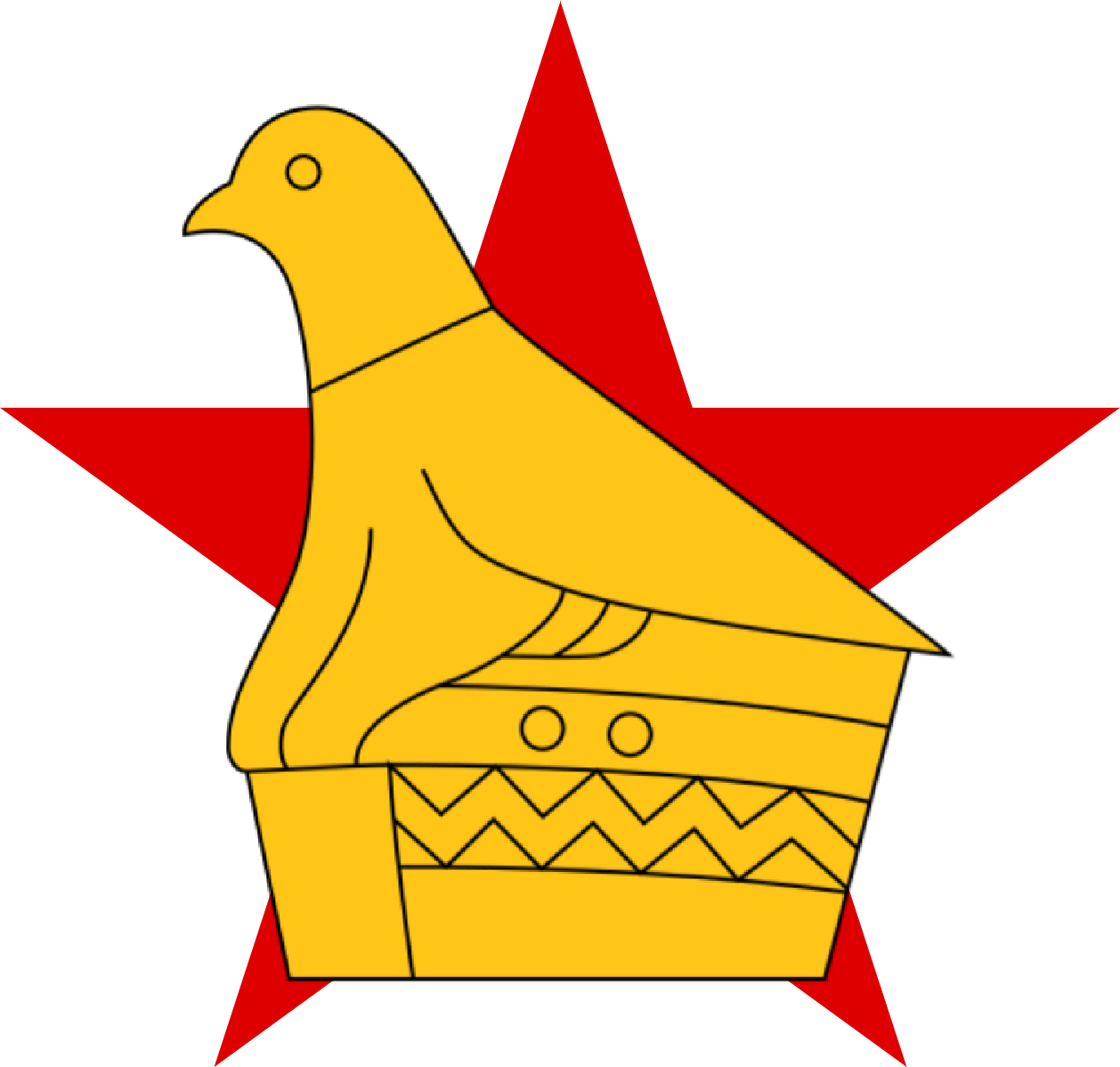
- Disease: cholera
- Source: vibrio cholerae
- Location: Zimbabwe
- Index case: Malawi
- Date: 12 February 2023
- Type: diarrhoeal disease
- Confirmed cases: not set
- Suspected cases^{‡}: >20,000
- Hospitalised cases: 109 (outdated)
- Deaths: 370
- Fatality rate: <1.85%
- ^{‡}Suspected cases have not been confirmed by laboratory tests as being due to this strain, although some other strains may have been ruled out.

A cholera outbreak started in Buhera District, Manicaland, Zimbabwe. The outbreak is thought to have started on 12 February 2023. As of now it has a geographic coverage of 45 out of 62 districts.

== Timeline ==
First cholera case was reported in Buhera District in Manicaland on the 12 February, 2023. The Ministry of Health and Child Care reported that there were 152 recorded cases and 12 deaths reported in August 2023 alone in Buhera. It was also reported in Hwedza District in Mashonaland East. As of 5 October 2023, the suspected cases and deaths were at 4609 and 100 respectively, confirmed at 935 cases while death toll at 30. On the 17 November 2023, the central government announced a state of emergency in Harare metropolitan. It now have a geographic coverage of 45 out of 62 districts.

== Response ==
In response to the outbreak, the Zimbabwean government imposed restrictions on gatherings; funeral attendees were limited to 50 people, and no food could be served. People were advised to avoid physical contact and social events, as well as to maintain proper hygiene. Zimbabwe banned large gatherings in October in response to outbreak.

== See also ==
- 2022–2024 Southern Africa cholera outbreak
- 2023—2024 cholera outbreak in South Africa
- 2023–2024 Zambian cholera outbreak
- 2024 mpox outbreak
