= 2023–2024 Zambian cholera outbreak =

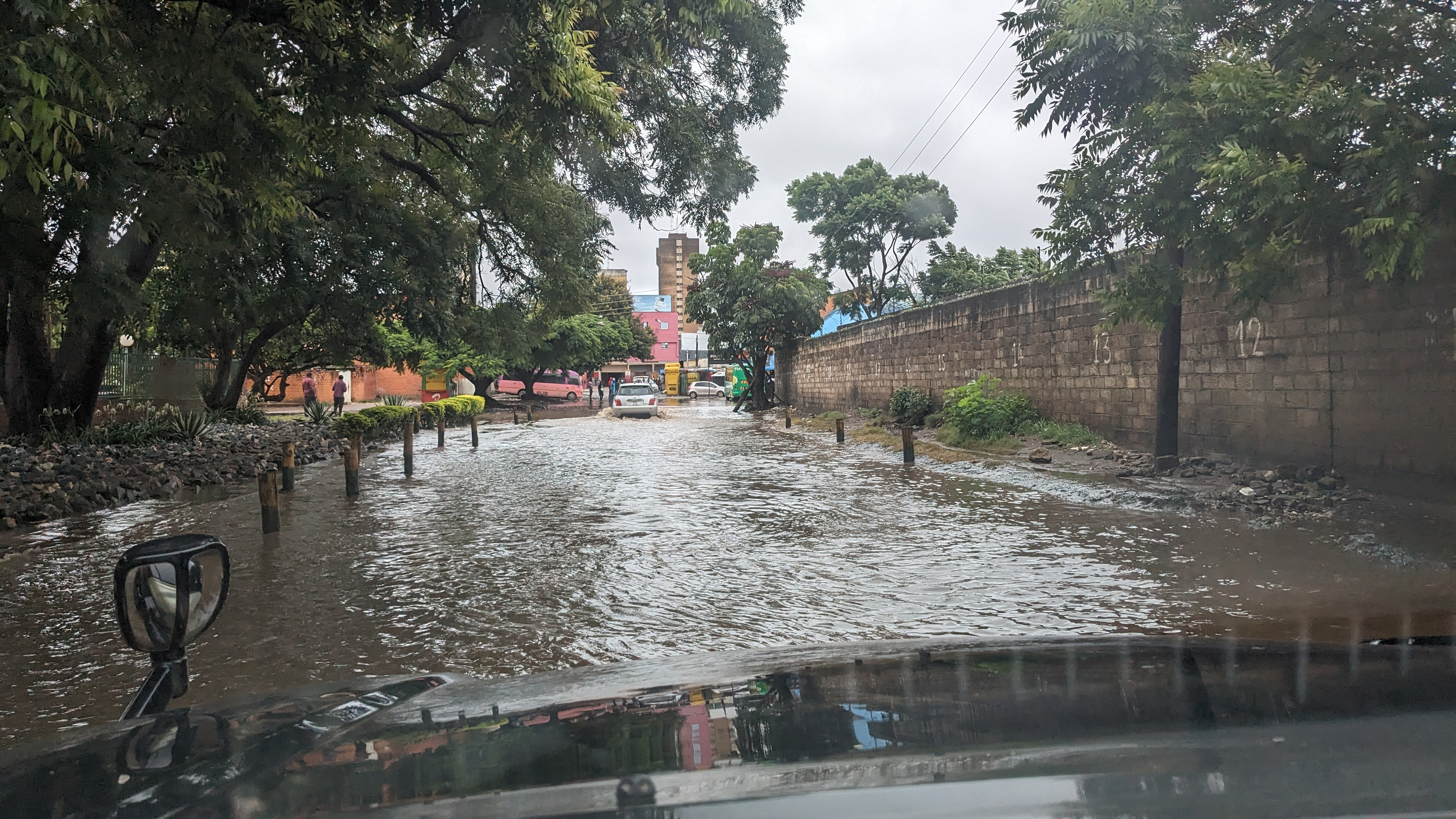
- Flooding in Lusaka, 20 January 2024
- Disease: Cholera
- Source: Vibrio cholerae
- Location: Zambia
- First reported: Vubwi District
- Date: January 2023 – July 2024
- Type: Diarrhoeal disease
- Confirmed cases: 19,840
- Recovered: 19,000
- Deaths: 685 (as of 22 February 2024)
- Fatality rate: ~3.5%

Government website
- znphi.co.zm

The 2023–2024 Zambian cholera outbreak, part of the 2022–2024 Southern Africa cholera outbreak, is currently one of the most severe health crises in the country's recent history, with its origins traced back to January 2023. The outbreak initially surfaced in Vubwi District in the Eastern Province and Mwansabombwe District in Luapula Province. By October 2023, the Zambia National Public Health Institute reported a cholera outbreak in the capital, Lusaka. Cholera cases have so far broken out in 15 districts in five out of the country's 10 provinces, with Lusaka, the country's capital recording the highest number of cases. Of particular concern is the rapid progression of the outbreak within Lusaka, where, within a week, the Ministry of Health reported a surge of 71.2% in cases and a staggering 175% increase in fatalities.

Partners affiliated with DG ECHO actively collaborate with the Ministry of Health, providing crucial support in various capacities. Initiatives include community sensitization and risk communication, distribution and control of chlorine at critical water points, contact tracing, and the management of oral rehydration points within Lusaka. There is an urgent imperative to intensify community engagement and bolster the supply of safe water in affected areas, coupled with continuous monitoring of water quality.

== Background ==
Cholera, a waterborne bacterial infection, has been a recurring health challenge in Zambia. The current outbreak has been identified as potentially the worst since the first recorded outbreak in 1977. The rapid spread of the disease has led to increased efforts by health workers to contain the crisis and provide essential medical assistance to those affected.

== Response ==
=== Response and challenges ===
President Hakainde Hichilema has called for the relocation of people from towns to villages, citing poor sanitation in densely populated urban areas as a significant factor contributing to the outbreak. The President's directive is aimed at minimizing the risk of further infections and creating a safer environment in rural areas. Family gatherings during funerals have been identified as potential hotspots for cholera transmission. In response, the Zambian Health Ministry has prohibited funerals and family burials. Health Minister Sylvia Masebo emphasized the importance of adhering to these measures to prevent the spread of the disease. "I've told them that they cannot participate in burials, and I also told them that they cannot have funerals at their homes. I also told the general public not to attend funerals anymore," stated Sylvia Masebo.

=== Public health measures and response ===
In response to the escalating crisis, Health Minister Sylvia Masebo revealed that the National Heroes Stadium in Lusaka, with a seating capacity of 60,000, has been repurposed as a treatment center for cholera. This decision aims to alleviate the strain on existing health facilities grappling with the surge in cholera cases. Masebo, emphasizing proactive measures, stated, "We continue sensitizing our citizens not to buy food from unsafe locations and to observe the highest level of hygiene so that together we can curb the spread of cholera." To reinforce this message, a mass sensitization roadshow was conducted in Lusaka on Thursday. In an additional measure to curb the spread of the disease, vending on the streets has been prohibited, as announced last week. These collective efforts underscore the gravity of the public health situation and the commitment of authorities to mitigate the impact of the cholera outbreak in Zambia. Africa Centres for Disease Control and Prevention has played a role in supporting Zambia's response to the cholera outbreak by deploying technical assistance officers, coordinating with key partners, and providing financial assistance. The organization is actively engaged in various interventions, including training healthcare workers, strengthening laboratory capacity, and procuring essential medical supplies to control and end the cholera crisis.

=== Oral cholera vaccination ===
In a determined effort to combat the cholera outbreak, Zambia initiated an extensive oral cholera vaccination campaign on 16 January 2024, concentrating efforts on the hotspots within the capital city of Lusaka, which has borne the brunt of the ongoing crisis. The campaign commenced with the distribution and administration of 1.4 million doses received on 15 January 2024, from the World Health Organization (WHO), which has allocated a total of 1.7 million doses to Zambia. The launch event took place in George Township, Lusaka, and was officiated by Zambia's Health Minister, Sylvia Masebo. Acknowledging the constraint in vaccine availability, Masebo announced that residents would receive a single dose instead of the recommended two doses. Notably, the vaccination program is also extended to health workers actively engaged in the frontline battle against cholera.

== Impact ==
=== Impact on education ===
The cholera outbreak has had significant repercussions on the nation's education sector and prompted stringent public health interventions. In response to the escalating crisis, authorities decided to postpone the reopening of schools by an additional three weeks, as announced by the Education Minister, Douglas Syakalima, on Thursday. Syakalima informed reporters in the capital, Lusaka, that both public and private early childhood, primary, and secondary schools will remain closed beyond the initially scheduled opening date of 8 January 2024. Consequently, the revised date for school resumption is now set for Monday, 29 January. This measure aims to safeguard the health and well-being of students and staff in the face of the ongoing cholera outbreak.

On 24 January 2024, Zambia declared an additional two-week extension of school closures, with a revised reopening date of 12 February, citing the escalating spread of cholera throughout the nation, notably in the capital city of Lusaka. Originally scheduled to resume on 8 January, the reopening of schools had already been postponed to 29 January due to the prevailing cholera outbreak. "In light of the escalating cholera cases affecting various parts of the country, the national disaster management and mitigation council of ministers, in a meeting held this morning, advised the Ministry of Education to further defer the opening date to Feb. 12," disclosed Education Minister Douglas Syakalima during a press conference in Lusaka. The Health Ministry reported that Zambia has documented 13,686 cholera cases since the outbreak began in October of the previous year, resulting in 518 fatalities and 12,365 recoveries. As of 24 January 801 patients are still undergoing treatment in hospitals.

== See also ==
- 2022-2024 Southern Africa cholera outbreak
- 2023 cholera outbreak in South Africa
- 2023 Zimbabwe cholera outbreak
- 2024 mpox outbreak
