= Disease diffusion mapping =

Map of disease risk for a region

Disease diffusion occurs when a disease is transmitted to a new location. It implies that a disease spreads, or pours out, from a central source. The idea of showing the spread of disease using a diffusion pattern is relatively modern, compared to earlier methods of mapping disease, which are still used today. According to Rytokonen, the goals of disease mapping are: 1) to describe the spatial variation in disease incidence to formulate an etiological hypothesis; 2) to identify areas of high risk in order to increase prevention; and 3) to provide a map of disease risk for a region for better risk preparedness.

Torsten Hägerstrand’s early work on “waves of innovation” is the basis that many medical cartographers and geographers use for mapping spatial diffusion (1968). The diffusion of disease can be described in four patterns: expansion diffusion, contagious diffusion, hierarchal diffusion and relocation diffusion. Cromley and McLafferty also mention network diffusion and mixed diffusion.

The diffusion of infectious disease tends to occur in a ‘wave’ fashion, spreading from a central source. Pyle mentions barriers that pose a resistance towards a wave of diffusion, which include but are not limited to: physiographic features (i.e. mountains, water bodies), political boundaries, linguistic barriers, and with diseases, a barrier could be differing control programs. The diffusion of disease can be identified as a normal distribution over time and translated into an S-shaped curve to show the phases of disease diffusion. The phases are: Infusion (25th percentile), Inflection (50th percentile), Saturation (75th percentile), and Waning to the upper limits.

== Disease diffusion types ==
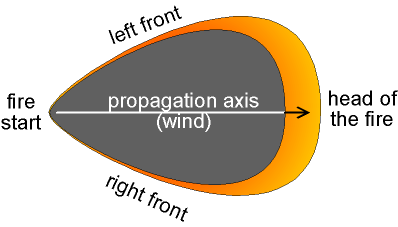
Spreading wildfire showing expansion diffusion

- Expansion diffusion occurs when the spreading phenomenon has a source and diffuses outwards into new areas, an example being a spreading wildfire.
- Relocation diffusion occurs when the spreading phenomenon migrates into new areas, leaving behind its origin or source of the disease.
- Contagious diffusion is the spread of an infectious disease through the direct contact of individuals with those infected.
- Hierarchal diffusion occurs when a phenomenon spreads through an ordered sequence of classes or places.
- Network diffusion occurs when a disease spreads via transportation and social networks, "reflecting the geographical and social structuring of human interactions".
- Mixed diffusion is a combination of contagious diffusion and hierarchal diffusion. AIDS is a prominent example in modern-day society of a mixed diffusion disease, often spreading along the hierarchal, network, and contagious diffusion patterns.

The value of mapping and Geographic Information Systems (GIS) is becoming better known to public health professionals to help link disease control to prevention efforts, which can aid in developing better immunization programs. GIS is an excellent tool used to identify spatial patterns and core areas of disease transmission. Disease maps can distinguish the low and high risk areas, as well as highlight “physical and/or socio-cultural” factors that contribute to the causation of disease. Understanding how a disease spreads gives health officials a better understanding of how to better serve the public.
