= 2017 dengue outbreak in Peshawar =

Disease outbreak in Pakistan

2017 Dengue outbreak in Peshawar, Pakistan
- Location: Peshawar, Pakistan
- Index case: Mid-2017
- Confirmed cases: 24,807
- Suspected cases: 4,320
- Deaths: 69

The location of Peshawar in Khyber Pakhtunkhwa, as part of Pakistan.

In the 2017 dengue outbreak in Peshawar, Pakistan, hundreds of incidents of dengue fever were reported in Peshawar in mid-2017. Initially, according to the health department of Khyber Pakhtunkhwa, 4,320 suspected cases were received by Khyber Teaching Hospital Peshawar and 831 were positive. About a dozen people died of dengue, starting in July. Punjab healthcare experts worked with local experts to control the dengue epidemic in Peshawar, with health workers going door-to-door to educate residents, as well as fumigation of the city to suppress mosquito populations.

== Background ==
=== Peshawar ===
Peshawar is the sixth largest city in Pakistan with a total area of 1,257 square kilometres, it is the capital of the Khyber Pakhtunkhwa province in Northern Pakistan. It is located on the flat Gandhara Plains, surrounded by mountain ranges on three sides. The climate is generally warm with an average temperature of 22.3 degrees Celsius and rainfall throughout the year.

The estimated population of Peshawar is 2.5 million, growing exponentially from 500,000 in 1980. The average household size in 2017 was 7.97 with a known housing shortage. Pashtuns are the main ethnic group, though Peshawar has seen a large influx of Afghan refugees resulting in unplanned and haphazard growth which governmental initiatives did not account for, resulting in ad-hoc planning and development and massive urban-sprawl which infrastructure, institutions and civic services struggle to support, particularly in the slums and settlement areas where poverty is high. Water supply and drainage systems in these areas are poor, resulting in increased water stagnation, especially in flooding seasons.

=== Dengue ===
Dengue is a non-contagious single-stranded positive-sense RNA viral infection, found in over 125 countries annually, spread by mosquitoes carrying the epidemic vectors Aedes albopictus and Aedes aegypti. It belongs to the family Flaviviridae, the genus Flavivirus and has five strains. These mosquitoes are most often found in urban indoor environments during daytime.

The World Health Organisation (WHO) considers dengue part of the top ten global health issues, with over 100 million cases resulting in 20,000–25,000 deaths annually, making it the leading cause of arthropod-born viral disease worldwide. It has an incubation phase of four to seven days, with symptoms lasting three to ten days. There is no cure and treatment involves managing symptoms.

Total dengue cases are often underestimated as over 50% of those infected are either; asymptomatic, have mild flu-like symptoms which they self-manage or are misdiagnosed. Up to 5% of cases develop severe symptoms resulting in shock, organ failure, haemorrhage and potentially death. The severity of symptoms is influenced by various host, environmental and virus factors.

A positive association exists between rainfall, temperature and humidity, and dengue fever prevalence. With prevalence highest in tropical and subtropical environments across the Americas, Asia and Africa. Pakistan has had ten major outbreaks since 1982.

== Details of the disaster ==
Throughout 2017 the Ministry of National Health Services, Regulations and Coordination in Pakistan reported higher than usual numbers of dengue fever cases. The highest number of confirmed laboratory cases was 24,807 in the Khyber Pakhtunkhwa province resulting in 69 deaths by November 2017. Of these, 23,541 confirmed cases with 65 deaths occurred in Peshawar, with most cases occurring in September (32%) and October (41%) during monsoon season.

Between July to August 2017, 52% of those infected were aged 25-64 years old, 29% were 15-24, 15% were 0-14 years old and 3% were over 65. 62% of those infected were male.

== Timeline ==
Pakistan has experienced nearly annual dengue epidemics with previous notable outbreaks in Lahore and Swat. Dengue was already endemic across much of Pakistan by July 2017.

Month	Event
July	A dengue situation was declared in Khyber Pakhtunkhwa province with over 500 positive cases.
August	Pakistan Red Crescent Society (PRCS) began initial screening camps and awareness drives in high-risk areas using provincial resources.
September	National authorities confirmed the outbreak as an emergency dengue disaster with 75,000 suspected cases, 24,382 confirmed, 73 deaths mainly in Peshawar.
October	October had the highest number of cases which coincided with the end of the monsoon rains. Vector surveillance with WHO identified "hot-spots" and started intensive community interventions.
October–November	Six new screening/diagnostic camps established (esp. Peshawar City, Nowshera, Mansehra). Mass school and community awareness campaigns conducted.
November	Rapid decline in dengue cases.

== Spatial distribution of the Dengue outbreak ==
The dengue outbreak affected 15 districts in Khyber Pakhtunkhwa province with Peshawar at the epicentre, diffused throughout the region by the Aedes aegypti mosquito. Urbanisation and improved travel infrastructure allowed the migration of infected vectors and people between different districts. The virus spread along key transport corridors to Mardan, Nowshera, Mansehra, Kohat, and Buner/Swabi. There were smaller outbreaks in Abbotabad and Mardan due to high urban concentration of risk. Rural areas had lower number of incidences but this could be due to potential under-reporting. The outbreak unfolded over six months, peaking in August to early September 2017, in alignment with the regional monsoon season that promotes Aedes aegypti breeding. The dense housing, standing water and poor drainage in these urban areas created stagnant water for ideal breeding sites for the mosquitos. The seasonality of the monsoon, alongside the temperate climate and rain-fed agriculture explained the surge of cases in October. Environmental mis-management and poor sanitation underpinned the spatial pattern.

== Clinical impacts ==
There was a heavy hospital burden in Peshawar with five main hospitals reporting the documented cases. Patients from these hospitals were moved between endemic and non-endemic areas which amplified the initial outbreak. There was a loss of work days in young adults (16-30 years) who were the most affected group leading to local economic impacts. There were reports of fever, body aches, vomiting, skin rashes, gum bleeding, nosebleeds and elevated liver enzymes. Fevers were universal but headache, fatigue and liver enlargement were highly prevalent. IgM antibodies were detected in 180 cases that confirmed both primary and secondary infections. Most cases were identified as dengue fever and few progressed to dengue hemorrhagic fever and there was no dengue shock syndrome reported. The case fatality rate was 0.28% which was lower than the previous epidemics in Lahore and Swat.

== Health consequences of Dengue Fever ==
=== Short-term Health Consequences ===
In Peshawar, 23,541 residents were laboratory-confirmed to have been infected with dengue fever. When underreporting and asymptomatic cases are taken into account, the actual number of infections is estimated to be considerably higher, indicating that tens of thousands of individuals suffered direct health impacts from the virus within a short period. The outbreak resulted in the deaths of 65 residents in Peshawar, representing an irreversible loss of life.

The most common short-term health impacts typically began with a mild to high fever, which was experienced by nearly all patients (100%).Severe headache, along with intense muscle and joint pain--characteristic symptoms of dengue fever—were also highly prevalent (95%), often causing significant discomfort and limiting patients' ability to carry out normal activities. Nausea and vomiting occurred in a considerable number of patients (70%), potentially leading to dehydration and electrolyte imbalance. A rash appeared in nearly one-third of cases (30%). In the most severe instances (5%), patients exhibited bleeding tendencies and faced life-threatening complications such as shock and organ failure.

The average age of dengue patients was approximately 26 years, with the majority of cases concentrated among individuals aged 16 to 30. This demographic represents a crucial segment of the social labor force, and their collective infection negatively impacted household livelihoods and posed challenges to social stability. Males faced a higher risk of infection (65.3%) and demonstrated a significantly greater likelihood of developing severe cases compared to females (accounting for 88.6% of fatal outcomes). This resulted in numerous families losing husbands, fathers, or sons, dealing a severe blow to family structures.

=== Long-term health consequences ===
While most people begin to feel better within a couple of weeks after dengue infection, this outbreak has shown that recovery is not always straightforward. Many patients, even those who had mild cases, reported that their health did not fully return to normal immediately after the fever and pain subsided. Health centres involved in the response highlighted several long-term consequences that became increasingly common as the outbreak progressed

One of the most widely reported issues is prolonged fatigue. Patients often described feeling "drained" or unusually weak for weeks after their initial recovery. Persistent joint and muscle discomfort was another recurring problem. Clinicians noted that although the acute pain of dengue usually lessens within a few days, many people continued to experience stiffness or soreness long after their fever resolved. For some, this lingering pain affected mobility and reduced their ability to perform tasks that required physical strength or endurance.

A number of patients also reported cognitive and emotional changes following the infection. Health workers observed complaints of "brain fog," difficulty concentrating, and slower thinking symptoms that were particularly troubling for learners preparing for exams or adults managing complex tasks. Alongside this, some individuals experienced mood fluctuations, increased irritability, or feelings of low motivation. These emotional and cognitive effects often made the recovery period feel longer and more stressful, even after physical symptoms had improved.

Although less common, more serious long-term complications did occur. Hospitals documented cases of ongoing liver inflammation, heart-related issues such as myocarditis, and neurological complications including prolonged headaches, coordination difficulties, or nerve-related weakness. Patients experiencing these complications often required repeated hospital visits, follow-up tests, or more intensive care. For their families, this added emotional and financial strain on top of an already difficult illness.

The outbreak also raised concerns about repeated infections. Because multiple dengue serotypes may circulate at the same time, individuals infected early in the outbreak may be at higher risk if they are infected again. Health professionals highlighted that a second infection with a different serotype can increase the chance of severe disease due to antibody-dependent enhancement (ADE). This makes prevention and ongoing community awareness crucial, even after someone has already recovered once.

Overall, the long-term consequences seen in this outbreak show that dengue does not end when the fever does. The lingering fatigue, emotional stress, cognitive challenges, and though rare serious organ involvement have placed additional pressure on families and the healthcare system. These experiences emphasize the importance of follow-up care, supportive recovery environments, and clear communication to help affected individuals regain their health safely and gradually.

=== Public health impact ===
The dengue outbreak in Peshawar placed a substantial burden on both the healthcare system and the broader community. With more than 23,000 confirmed infections and many more likely unreported health facilities quickly became overwhelmed. Hospitals already operating with limited staff and resources had to manage a sudden surge in patients experiencing fever, dehydration, or severe complications. This reduced the availability of routine services and delayed care for patients with other urgent health needs.

Beyond the clinical impact, families experienced significant social and economic strain. Because most dengue cases occurred among individuals aged 16 to 30, many households temporarily lost their most active earners and caregivers. Long recovery periods, lingering fatigue, and difficulty concentrating meant that even after the acute illness resolved, many people were unable to return to work immediately. As a result, these cognitive difficulties made it harder for many people especially daily labourers to work at their normal pace. Their reduced ability to focus or maintain their usual strength meant lower earnings, which deepened financial stress for households already living on limited resources.

The outbreak also had emotional and psychological ripple effects. Families worried about reinfection, especially given the presence of multiple dengue serotypes. Communities experienced heightened anxiety as severe cases and deaths were reported, and many households adjusted their daily routines to avoid mosquito exposure. These behavioural changes reflected not only concern for physical health but also the stress and uncertainty that accompany widespread outbreaks.

Economically, the outbreak disrupted local productivity. When thousands of young adults fall ill at the same time, workplaces slow down, schools face absenteeism, and household responsibilities shift abruptly. Low-income families, already vulnerable, were affected most deeply, as even short periods without income can create long-lasting financial challenges.

In general, the outbreak demonstrated that dengue's impact extends far beyond the initial infection. The strain on hospitals, the emotional stress within households, and the economic setbacks experienced across communities highlight the need for strong prevention strategies, sustained community awareness, and accessible follow-up care. These measures are essential not only to reduce infections but also to protect the social and economic well-being of affected populations.

== Local response ==
After the first dengue cases were confirmed in July 2017, the provincial government of Khyber Pakhtunkhwa (KP) launched an emergency public health response to contain the outbreak in Peshawar. With technical support from the World Health Organization (WHO), the provincial health department established a Dengue Response Unit to coordinate vector control, patient management, and surveillance activities.

Health teams conducted door-to-door insecticide spraying, larvicidal treatment, and fumigation in high-risk neighborhoods. By October 2017, more than 190,000 households had been reached through these operations.

Public awareness campaigns were organised in schools, mosques, and community centres. Residents were encouraged to remove standing water, use mosquito nets, and apply repellents to prevent bites. Hospitals and laboratories were strengthened to improve case detection and patient care. The Pakistan Red Crescent Society (PRCS) deployed volunteers and mobile health camps that distributed mosquito nets and repellents, provided health education, and referred severe cases to hospitals.

By the end of the outbreak, official reports estimated around 24,800 confirmed cases and about 70 deaths in KP province. The combined interventions of local authorities, communities, and aid organisations helped reduce transmission and improve preparedness for future dengue epidemics.

== International response ==
The WHO provided continuous technical and operational support to Khyber Pakhtunkhwa's health authorities. WHO teams trained local health workers, monitored mosquito breeding sites, and improved data management systems. The organisation identified Peshawar as the epicentre of the outbreak, reporting approximately 87,000 suspected cases, 18,900 confirmed infections, and 58 deaths.

The IFRC supported PRCS operations in Khyber Pakhtunkhwa with approximately 143,000 Swiss francs in emergency funding to expand community awareness, household-level monitoring, and the distribution of medical and mosquito-prevention materials.

The collaboration between WHO, IFRC, and local agencies established a unified command structure and integrated resources, which was recognized as a strong example of a coordinated public health response and a model for future epidemic control. The 2017 Peshawar dengue outbreak highlighted the importance of early surveillance, community participation, and cross-agency cooperation in controlling mosquito-borne diseases. Lessons learned from this outbreak continue to inform dengue preparedness and response strategies across Pakistan and other South Asian countries.

== Lessons learned ==
The 2017 dengue outbreak in Peshawar, Khyber Pakhtunkhwa (KPK), Pakistan, was among the most severe public health crises in the region in recent years. It exposed significant gaps in urban infrastructure, community awareness, and governmental response capacity, while also providing valuable lessons for future vector-borne disease control.

=== Individual and community level ===
Research on affected neighbourhoods showed that many people who live in impacted neighborhoods were found to be ignorant of how to prevent mosquito-borne illnesses. Limited awareness reduced the chance of recognising early dengue symptoms, such as continuous fever and body pain, which often delayed treatment. Research further documented the use of mosquito repellents, mosquito nets, and protective clothing during peak mosquito activity hours as frequent practices among residents with higher awareness levels. Additional field surveys noted that regular cleaning of open containers, plant pots, and waste items reduced potential breeding sites around households, contributing to lower observed mosquito density in some communities.Residents need to actively participate in the community's promotional activities to learn similar basic measures for protecting themselves and minimize unnecessary transmission risks as much as possible.

=== Government and public-health response capacity ===
Government documents show that the provincial administration established a Dengue Response Unit (DRU) to coordinate surveillance, laboratory diagnostics, vector control, and public communication. Assessments of the outbreak response highlighted limitations such as restricted laboratory capacity and fragmented information systems. The rapid increase in dengue cases placed pressure on health facilities, underscoring the significance of routine early warning mechanisms and stronger emergency management.

Media coverage had a significant influence on public perception during the outbreak. Transparent reporting supported public trust, while inconsistent or inaccurate information occasionally contributed to confusion and reduced compliance. Analyses in public-health literature emphasised the importance of coordinated and consistent communication strategies to support community engagement during large outbreaks.

=== Environmental and multi-sectoral cooperation ===
Environmental conditions were identified as major contributors to dengue transmission. Studies associated climatic variation, rapid urbanisation, and ageing infrastructure with increased dengue incidence in the region. Long term environmental management supported by monitoring of high-risk areas was considered essential for future prevention. Research also indicated that effective dengue control requires cooperation between public-health authorities and sectors such as water management, and urban planning.

Findings from the Peshawar outbreak have been used as reference points for improving vector-borne disease management across South Asia. Research outcomes contributed to discussions on strengthening surveillance systems, supporting community education, and improving collaboration across sectors.

== See also ==
- 2011 dengue outbreak in Pakistan
