= 2026 Bangladesh measles outbreak =

Disease outbreak in Bangladesh

2026 measles outbreak in Bangladesh
- Municipalities and sub-districts designated as outbreak hotspots (As assessed by the MoHFW till 4 April 2026); Districts with active hotspots Districts with confirmed or suspected cases Districts with no reported cases

- Cases per 100,000 inhabitants by divisions (15 March — 12 May 2026)
- Disease: Measles
- Pathogen: Measles morbillivirus (MV)
- Location: Bangladesh
- Date: Late February 2026 – present
- Confirmed cases: 24,219
- Suspected cases: 235,475
- Hospitalized cases: 209,854
- Recovered: 201,153
- Deaths: 105 (confirmed cases); 1,272 (all cases)
- Fatality rate: 0.43% (confirmed cases); 0.49% (all cases)

In mid-March 2026, a measles outbreak started in Bangladesh. According to the Directorate General of Health Services (DGHS), as of 5 November 2026, 1,167 have died with suspected measles symptoms, alongside 105 confirmed measles deaths, and 235,475 have been recorded with suspected measles symptoms, alongside 24,219 confirmed cases. This led the government to start an emergency mass vaccination of children aged between 6 and 59 months.

== Background ==
Bangladesh has achieved significant progress in measles control by conducting mass immunization campaigns. Between 2014 and 2015, nationwide measles–rubella (MR) campaigns vaccinated over 50 million children. By the mid-2010s, more than 92% of children received the initial vaccine dose, and second-dose coverage surpassed 80%. The mortality rate of children aged under five due to measles declined rapidly over three decades.

However, over the years, the programme became weak, irregular, and delayed. Furthermore, the COVID-19 pandemic contributed to the government's focus shifting towards COVID-19 vaccination, hampering the MR campaigns. In April 2020, the World Health Organization (WHO) indicated that many countries had started suspending their measles vaccination programmes due to the impact of the COVID-19 pandemic. It was projected that 117 million children would be at risk of infection.

Though the service was resumed partially in the following years, the interim government of Muhammad Yunus reportedly neglected the programme due to the overall decline of measles in the country, and halted funds for the vaccination. Political instability and administrative disruption during the period also contributed to the weakening of the programme.

== Epidemiology and demographics ==
Amid its deadliest measles outbreak in decades, Bangladesh has reported the highest number of cases of any country in 2026, with India recording the second-highest number.

According to the Minister of Health and Family Welfare Sardar Shakhawat Hossain Bokul, 82% of the measles and rubella infected were children aged-below-five. 91% of cases occurred among children aged 1 to 14 years. WHO assessed the risk at the national level as high.

The hotspots are concentrated in densely populated urban centers, including Dhaka, which accounts for 36% of cases, as well as Rajshahi and Chattogram. This represents an at least 75-fold increase from 2025.

== Statistics by division ==
Statistics by division (as of 6 September 2026)
Division	Suspicious Cases		Confirmed Cases		Number of Admissions	Recovered
Division	Total Number of Cases	Total Number of Deaths	Total Number of Cases	Total Number of Deaths	Total Number of Patient Hospitalized	Total Number of Patients Discharged from Hospital
Dhaka	70,786	401	12,000	63	54,983	53,156
Chittagong	32,221	65	2,711	10	32,204	30,583
Barisal	17,962	56	776	19	17,192	16,272
Sylhet	11,900	155	1,019	3	11,236	10,829
Khulna	10,630	36	489	0	10,174	9,773
Rajshahi	9,811	92	1,418	3	8,783	8,868
Mymensingh	7,865	75	751	2	7,489	7,127
Rangpur	2,903	14	532	0	2,107	2,164
Total	164,148	894	19,696	100	144,168	138,772

== Response ==
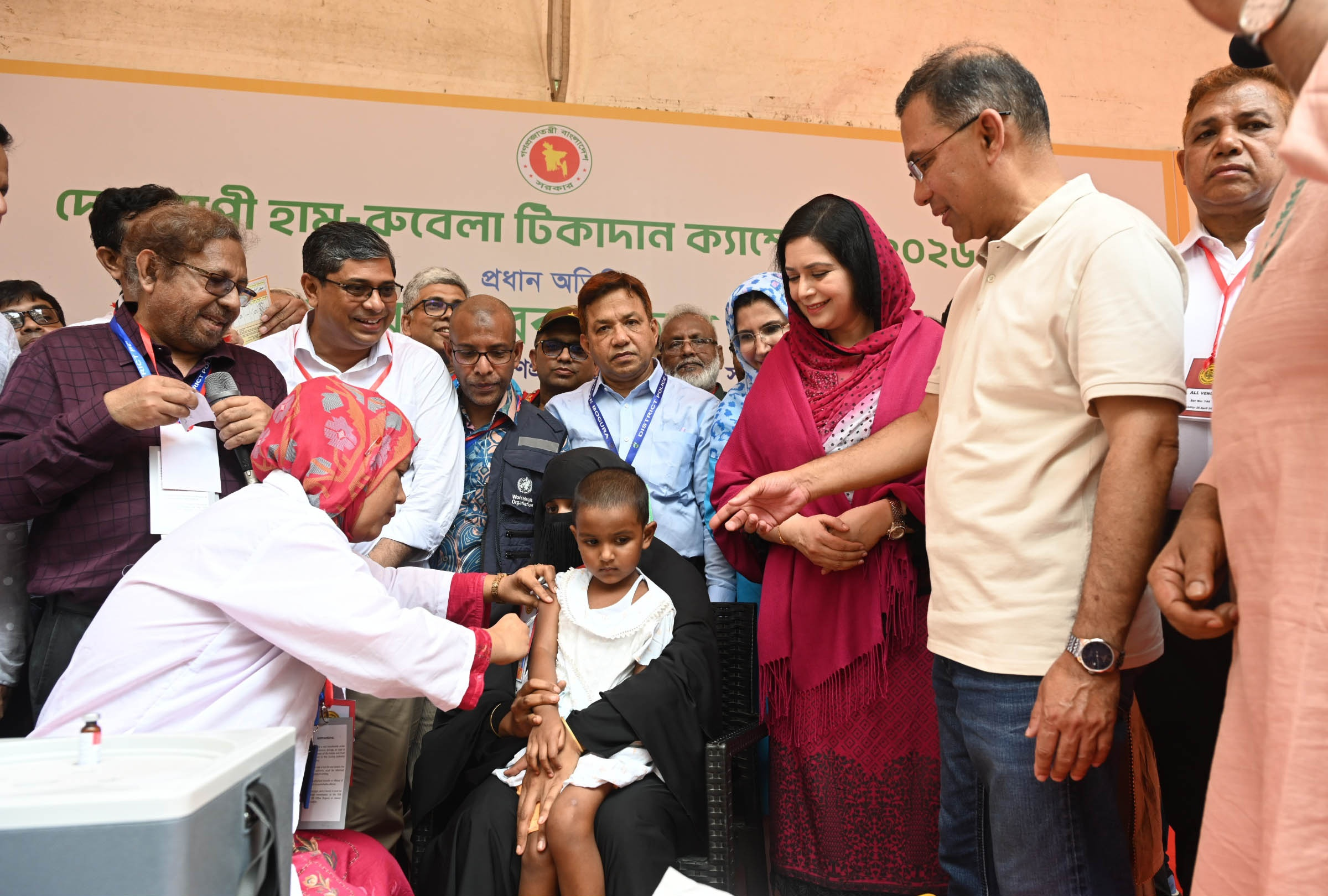
Prime Minister Tarique Rahman observing measles-rubella vaccination drive in Bogura in April 2026

The Minister of Home Affairs Salahuddin Ahmed vowed to control measles within 2026. Leave for medical staff was also cancelled.

=== Vaccination ===
The Ministry of Health and Family Welfare identified 30 "hotspots" from 20 districts and took measures to start emergency vaccination in these areas. The emergency mass vaccination campaign was launched on 5 April 2026. Initially covering the Dhaka North and South City Corporations, and Mymensingh and Barisal Districts, the Minister of Health, Sardar Shakhawat Hossain Bokul said that mass vaccination throughout the country will start from 3 May.

== See also ==
- Epidemiology of measles
