= 2022–2024 Southern Africa cholera outbreak =

Cholera outbreak in Southern Africa

- Disease: Cholera
- Location: Southern Africa; Eastern Africa
- Date: March 2022 – present
- Confirmed cases: >658,948
- Deaths: >12,121

The 2022–2026 Southern Africa cholera outbreak is an outbreak that has spread across Southern and Eastern Africa. It started in Machinga District in Malawi in March 2022. The cholera outbreak in Malawi linked to cases in South Africa, the strains belong to the seventh cholera pandemic. Rather than being a resurgence of a previously circulating strain in Africa, these cases likely resulted from the introduction of a new cholera agent from South Asia into Africa.

== Timeline ==
In March 2022, Malawi recorded its first cases of cholera.

In January 2024, it was reported that around 300 people had died following a cholera outbreak in Zambia.

== Affected countries ==
- Democratic Republic of the Congo
- Malawi
- Mozambique
- South Africa
- Tanzania
- Zambia
- Zimbabwe
