= 1707–08 Iceland smallpox epidemic =

Disease outbreak in Iceland

- Disease: Smallpox
- Pathogen: Variola major
- Location: Iceland, Kingdom of Denmark
- Index case: Icelandic man who died en route from Denmark (?)
- Dates: 1707–1709
- Confirmed cases: Over 30,000
- Deaths: 12,000

Iceland experienced one of its deadliest outbreaks of smallpox beginning in 1707. The epidemic, known in Iceland as Stórabóla, ultimately killed between 12,000 and 18,000 Icelanders, close to one-quarter of the island's population at the time.

== Background ==
Iceland in 1707 was a dependency of the Kingdom of Denmark. It had a small and exclusively rural population, with no towns or villages. Famine conditions in the late seventeenth century had already reduced the population, and only 50,681 people according to one tally of the 1703 census.

Epidemic diseases like smallpox did not naturally sustain themselves on the island due to the relatively sparse population. Smallpox was endemic in mainland Scandinavia and the British Isles, however, presenting a vulnerability to cross-Atlantic spread of contagious diseases. Although early modern Icelanders did understand shipborne miasma to be the source of epidemics of smallpox and plague, preventative measures such as disinfection or quarantine were not practiced.

Smallpox reached Iceland in 1655–1658 and again in 1670–1672, but the latter outbreak did not spread throughout the island, meaning that in most regions only the oldest generation had immunity to the disease.

== Epidemic ==
In 1707, smallpox arrived in Iceland aboard a merchant ship from Denmark that made harbour at Eyrarbakki. Contemporary reports pinpoint the source of the epidemic as contaminated clothing that had belonged to an Icelandic student at the University of Copenhagen, Gísli Bjarnason. Accounts diverge as to whether Gísli Bjarnason died of smallpox while still in Copenhagen or in or near Norway en route to Iceland, but his belongings were returned to his family, who lived at the farm of Ás í Holtum. Although there is no evidence that other persons on board the Eyrarbakki ship were infected, Jón Steffensen has argued that fomites were likely not limited to the late Gísli Bjarnason's clothing and that the outbreak may have started simultaneously at Ás í Holtum and at Eyrarbakki. The next year it had spread to most regions of Iceland. Smallpox reached remote areas of East Iceland in 1709. Ultimately, the outbreak may have killed a quarter of the population of Iceland at the time.
