= 1782 Influenza pandemic =

Influenza pandemic emerging in Asia in 1782

- Disease: Influenza
- Location: Worldwide
- First outbreak: Asia
- Arrival date: 1782

In 1782 a pandemic of influenza emerged in Asia before spreading worldwide. It resulted in severe disruption to society in Europe and the Americas as it disabled populations with sudden and widespread illness, with the flu even affecting dogs and cats. Occurring at the height of the Age of Enlightenment, was noted by contemporary physicians, generals, and medical researchers who sought to explain the infectious causes and treatments for influenza.

== Europe ==
The pandemic reached Europe in the spring, and European ships quickly diffused influenza across the continent. Flu spread rapidly and noticeable epidemics rarely lingered in a communities for longer than 2 months.

=== England ===
Flu was widespread in London during the pandemic of 1782.

Influenza inhibited the British Army's post-war activities as well. Admiral Kempenfelt set sail from Spithead with a squadron of ships on 2 May, among them the Goliath. By the 29th the flu had spread so thoroughly through the Goliath and other vessels' crews that the whole squadron was obliged to return to port in England. Dr. Grant describes that the epidemic raged

=== France ===
By August 1782, Dr. Grant had written that the flu "still rages in parts of France."

=== Sweden and Russia ===
Flu spread to Scandinavia during the springs. Ship traffic spread the flu quickly along the coasts. On the Island of Tjörn deaths spiked from 9 in April to 25 in May, well above average mortalities for summer.

Up to 40,000 people fell sick in one day in Saint Petersburg.
