= 1772–1773 Persian Plague =

18th century Plague epidemic in Persia

- Disease: Bubonic plague
- First outbreak: Baghdad
- Dates: 1772–1773
- Deaths: approximately 2 million

The Persian plague epidemic of 1772–1773, also simply known as the Persian Plague, was a massive outbreak of plague, more specifically Bubonic plague, in the Persian Empire, which claimed around 2 million lives in total. It was one of the most devastating Plague epidemics in recorded human history. The outbreak resulted in the introduction of several quarantine measures for the first time in the Persian Gulf regions.

== Outbreak ==
The epidemic is believed to have started in Baghdad in the winter of 1772. It then spread to other parts of the Persian-controlled lands. By 1773, the epidemic reached Basra, where it proved to be especially devastating, claiming more than 250,000 lives there alone. The Plague then quickly spread further southwards along the Persian Gulf, eventually reaching Bahrain. Eastwards, the epidemic extended as far as Bombay in India (modern-day Mumbai).

At the peak of the outbreak, a thousand deaths were recorded on a daily basis all throughout the Persian Empire.
