= 1899 Porto plague outbreak =

Late 19th-century epidemic in Portugal

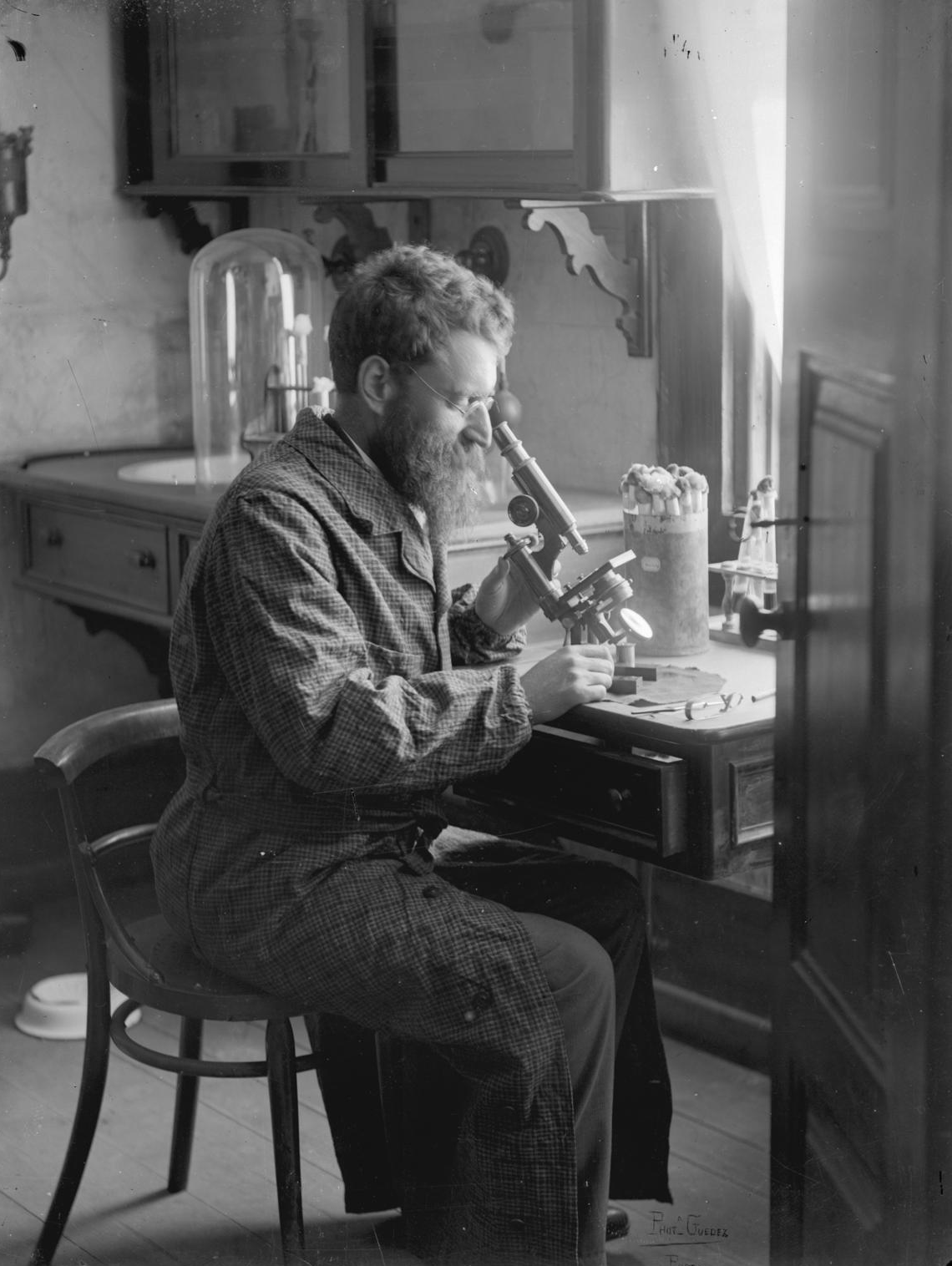
- Ricardo Jorge working in the Porto Municipal Bacteriological Laboratory
- Date: 1899
- Location: Porto, Kingdom of Portugal
- Cause: Bubonic plague
- Outcome: 320 cases
- Deaths: 132 deaths

The 1899 Porto plague outbreak was an epidemic of bubonic plague centered in the city of Porto, in the north of Portugal.

== First outbreak of the third plague pandemic in Europe ==
The arrival of plague in the Portuguese city of Porto signalled the first outbreak of the third plague pandemic in Europe, attracting international attention, due to fears of a return of the Black Death in the continent. It also pitched local and national authorities as well as medical experts in heated arguments about the nature of the disease and the way to contain it, namely, the controversial decision to surround the city by a military-enforced cordon sanitaire for four months, imposed by the government of Prime Minister José Luciano de Castro.

== Laboratory proof for the responsible infectious agent ==
The city's Medical Health Officer, Ricardo Jorge, head of the city's Municipal Services of Health and Hygiene and of the Municipal Bacteriological Laboratory, led the efforts to contain the disease and personally gathered laboratory proof to correctly identify the responsible infectious agent: this earned him a great reputation as a modern sanitarian and bacteriologist and launched his highly successful national and international career.

== Deaths ==
There were 132 deaths attributed to the plague outbreak, out of 320 total cases. Eminent bacteriologist Luís da Câmara Pestana contracted the disease after receiving a small scratch while examining a plague corpse during the outbreak, and died shortly afterwards.

== Political impact ==
The plague outbreak had considerable political, social, and economic repercussions: it exacerbated class divisions and tensions between the republicans in Porto and the royalist government in Lisbon (the centuries-old Portuguese Monarchy and would be replaced by the Portuguese First Republic in a revolution just 10 years later). Portugal's public health legislation was modernised in the years following the crisis; the Directorate-General of Health was established in response to the outbreak;

== See also ==
- List of epidemics
