= 580 dysentery epidemic in Gaul =

Disease outbreak in Europe

There was a large outbreak of a disease in Gaul (Francia) in the year 580. It is largely known from the writings of Gregory of Tours who claimed it was dysentery. This epidemic took the lives of several prominent Franks of the period, including:

- Austregilde wife of King Guntram
- several children of King Chilperic I
- Nantinus, Count of Angoulême

== Contagion ==
Some authors have argued that the contagion may have been something other than dysentery on the basis of Gregory's description of the symptoms. Several authors writing on the history of disease have claimed that this was an epidemic of smallpox. If true, this would be one of the earliest known outbreaks of the disease in European history.

Gregory's use of the Latin term "variola" (meaning 'spotted') for this disease in his writings, which he believed to be dysentery, is also the first recorded use of this term to refer to what may have been smallpox (which today has the scientific name 'Variola').

== Gregory of Tours ==
Gregory of Tours, from whose writings this epidemic is largely known, described the epidemic:

A very grievous plague followed these prodigies For while the kings were quarreling and again preparing for civil war, dysentery seized upon nearly the whole of the Gauls. The sufferers had a high feverh with vomiting and excessive pain in the kidneys; the head and neck were heavy. Their expectorations were of a saffron color or at least green. It was asserted by many that it was a secret poison. The common people called it internal pimples and this is not incredible, seeing that when cupping glasses were placed on the shoulders or legs mattery places formed and broke and the corrupted blood ran out and many were cured. Moreover herbs that are used to cure poisons were drunk and helped a good many. This sickness began in the month of August and seized upon the little ones and laid them on their beds. We lost dear sweet children whom we nursed on our knees or carried in our arms and nourished with attentive care, feeding them with our own hand. But wiping away our tears we say with the blessed Job: 'The Lord has given; the Lord has taken away; the Lord's will has been done. Blessed be his name through the ages.'

— Gregory of Tours,

Austregilde, the wife of King Guntram, reportedly ordered for her doctors to be killed when she died of the disease, as she blamed them for her sickness. Her husband carried out her wishes after she succumbed.
