= 2011 dengue outbreak in Pakistan =

Nationalist fever in Pakistan

2011 Dengue Outbreak in Pakistan
- Disease: Dengue fever
- Location: Punjab, Pakistan
- Date: 2011
- Confirmed cases: 14,000+
- Deaths: 300+

Dengue fever is an important infectious disease in Pakistan with increasingly frequent epidemics. Despite the efforts of the Government of Pakistan, especially in Punjab, the high cost of prevention has limited the ability of Pakistan to control epidemics. In Pakistan, in the summer of 2011, more than 300 people died of Dengue fever. The prevalence of the disease was over 14,000. The outbreaks occurred mostly in Lahore, in the Punjab province.

== 2011 epidemic ==
=== Morbidity and mortality ===
In November 2010, more than 21,204 people were diagnosed with dengue fever. Those infected were mainly from Punjab. Patients were admitted to dedicated wards in government hospitals. The severity of the epidemic was greatest in Lahore.

The secretary of the Punjab Mineral Development Corporation, Ataullah Siddiqui and Ghiasuddin, a member of the Punjab Public Service Commission, were also among those who died as a result of the dengue fever. On 30 September 2011, Punjab lawmaker Mumtaz Jajja also died of dengue fever. Eight Chinese engineers were taken ill.

=== Government response ===
A special tribunal for dengue fever was established. The chairman of the Dengue Emergency Response Committee was Khawaja Saad Rafique. The Government of Pakistan and the provincial Government of Punjab took preventive measures to reduce the spread of the disease. A hotline called the "Punjab Health Line Project for Dengue" was set up to facilitate awareness of the signs and symptoms of dengue fever, provide help to the people affected and identify areas where the epidemic may have spread. Teams of workers fumigated areas, particularly educational institutions and rural areas where the Aedes mosquito was present. In early September 2011, the Government of Punjab (Pakistan) ordered the schools, colleges and universities in Punjab, Pakistan to close for 10 days for intensive fogging to eliminate the vector mosquitoes. Article 144 was implemented in Lahore city for the prevention of dengue fever. After an appeal by the Government of Punjab (Pakistan), private hospitals agreed to provide free treatment to dengue patients. During dengue fever epidemics, the Pakistan army created camps in Lahore city. The Pakistan Air Force has also assisted the government. The Punjab government worked to increase public awareness. Local authorities in Hyderabad held a seminar. Other programs were held in educational facilities. A 24-hour government sponsored online service, the "Punjab Health Line Project For Dengue" provided information about the disease and its prevention.

=== International response ===
In 2011, the Government of Sri Lanka gave medicines and staff to Punjab. A group of 12 doctors from Sri Lanka came to Lahore to assist. The Indonesian government dispatched a medical team of twenty to assist the Pakistani authorities. The World Health Organization provided technical guidance along with support for provincial and territorial dengue monitoring and coordination committees.

== See also ==
- 2017 dengue outbreak in Peshawar
