= Third plague pandemic =

Bubonic plague pandemic, beginning 1855

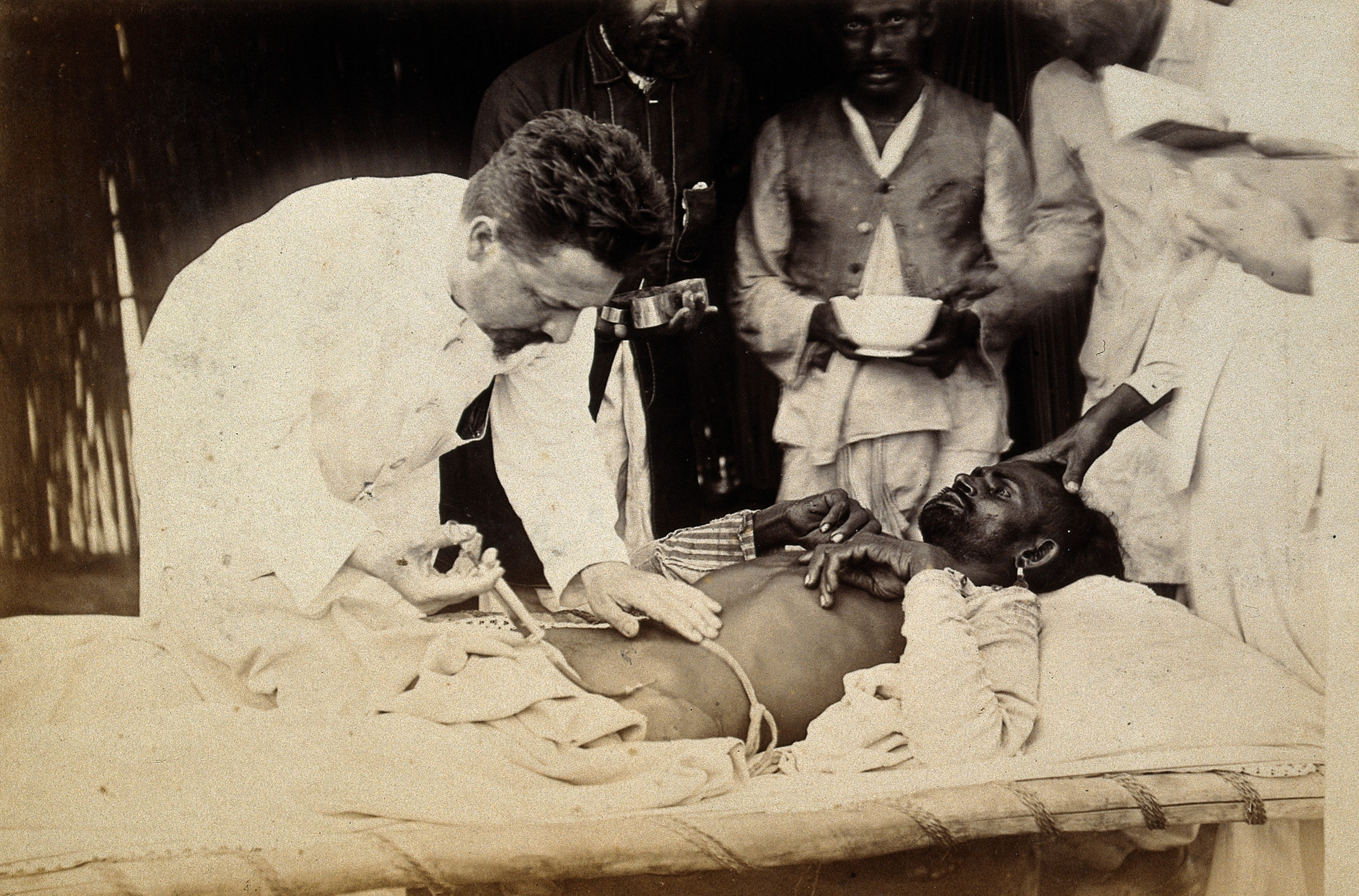
- Plague patient being injected by a doctor in 1897, British Raj India
- Disease: Bubonic plague
- Location: India, China, worldwide
- Dates: 1855–1960 (105 years)
- Deaths: 10 million in India, 2.2 million in China, approximately 3 million elsewhere

The third plague pandemic was a major plague pandemic that began in Yunnan, China, in 1855. Its name refers to its status as the third of at least three known major episodes of bubonic plague. This pandemic caused by the spread of the bacterium Yersinia pestis spread to all inhabited continents, and ultimately led to at least 15 million deaths worldwide, including 10~12 million in British Raj India and 2.2 million in China. It is estimated to have had one of the highest death tolls among pandemics in human history, though the third plague pandemic killed fewer people than the second plague pandemic (and possibly the first).

According to the World Health Organization, the pandemic was considered active until 1960, when worldwide casualties dropped below 200 per year. Plague deaths have continued at a lower level ever since, as plague persists in enzootic reservoirs across Asia, Africa, South America, and the western United States.

== History ==
The first plague pandemic began with the Plague of Justinian, which ravaged the Byzantine Empire and surrounding areas in 541 and 542; the pandemic persisted in successive waves until the middle of the 8th century. The second began with the Black Death, which killed at least one third of Europe's population in a series of expanding waves of infection from 1346 to 1353; this pandemic recurred regularly until the 19th century.

The plague which spread from Yunnan along China's Southeast Coast and across the world manifested almost exclusively as bubonic plague, with documentation of incidental pneumonic and septicemic forms. It was carried around the world through ocean-going trade, through transporting infected persons, rats, and cargoes harboring fleas.

Historians of the late-Qing plague epidemics generally include the Manchurian plague epidemic of 1910–11, which killed 45,000–60,000 people, as defined within the third pandemic's scope. The pneumonic Manchurian plague epidemic was geographically, ecologically, genetically, and epidemiologically distinct from the bubonic plague which spread globally from Southern China. It spread throughout the region of Manchuria, reaching Vladivostok and Beijing (which was connected to Manchuria by the Imperial Chinese Railway), but not far beyond due to port and railway closures as well as preventive medical protocols.

== Origins ==
The bubonic plague was endemic in populations of infected ground rodents in Central Asia and was a known cause of death among the migrant and established human populations in that region for centuries. An influx of new people because of political conflicts and global trade led to the spread of the disease throughout the world from Asia to the rest of Europe, to reach Africa and the Americas.

A natural reservoir or nidus for plague is in western Yunnan: it is still a health risk. The third pandemic of plague originated in the area after a rapid influx of Han Chinese to exploit the demand for minerals, primarily copper, in the second half of the 19th century. By 1850, the population had exploded to over 7 million people. Increasing transportation throughout the region brought people in contact with plague-infected fleas, the primary vector between the yellow-breasted or buff-breasted rat (Rattus flavipectus) aka Rattus tanezumi and humans. People brought the fleas and rats back into growing urban areas, where small outbreaks sometimes reached epidemic proportions. The plague spread further and began to appear in the Pearl River delta, including Canton and Hong Kong. Although William McNeil and others believe the plague to have been brought from the interior to the coastal regions by troops returning from battles against the Muslim rebels, Benedict suggested evidence to favour the growing and lucrative opium trade, which began after about 1840.

In the city of Canton, beginning in March 1894, the disease killed 80,000 people in a few weeks. Daily water-traffic with the nearby city of Hong Kong rapidly spread the plague. Within two months, after 100,000 deaths, the death rates dropped below epidemic rates, but the disease continued to be endemic in Hong Kong until 1929. The plague reached many cities such as Yunnan, Hong Kong, Kobe, Calcutta, etc.

== Global distribution ==
The network of global shipping ensured the widespread distribution of the disease over the next few decades. Recorded outbreaks included the following:

- Yunnan, Qing China 1855–1870.
- Beihai, Qing China 1882.
- Guangzhou, Qing China 1894.
- British Hong Kong 1894.
- Japanese Taiwan, Empire of Japan 1896 (until 1923 Great Kantō earthquake).
- Bombay Presidency, India, 1896–1898.
- Calcutta, India, 1898.
- French Madagascar, 1898.
- Kobe, 1898.
- Mecca, Ottoman Empire 1899.
- Khedivate of Egypt, 1899.
- Manchuria, China 1899.
- Paraguay, 1899.
- Porto, Portugal, 1899.
- South Africa, 1899–1902.
- Hawaii, 1899–1900.
- Glasgow, United Kingdom, 1900.
- San Francisco, United States, 1900.
- Manila, 1900.
- Australia, 1900–1905.
- Russian Empire/Soviet Union, 1900–1927.
- Fujian, China 1901.
- Thailand, 1904.
- British Burma, 1905.
- French Tunisia, 1907.
- Trinidad, Venezuela, Peru and Ecuador, 1908.
- Bolivia and Brazil, 1908.
- Freston, Suffolk, United Kingdom, 1910 (disputed)
- Manchurian plague, 1910–1911.
- Cuba and Puerto Rico, 1912.

Each of the areas, as well as Great Britain, France, and other areas of Europe, continued to experience plague outbreaks and casualties until the 1960s, although extremely few of these occurred after 1950. The last significant outbreak of plague associated with the pandemic occurred in Peru and Argentina in 1945.

=== 1894 Hong Kong plague ===
The 1894 Hong Kong plague was a major outbreak of the third global pandemic from the late 19th century to the early 20th century. The first case, discovered in May 1894, was a hospital clerk who had just returned from Canton. The hardest hit was the mountainous area in Sheung Wan, the most densely populated area in Hong Kong, characterised by Chinese-style buildings. From May to October 1894, the plague killed more than 6,000 people, leading to the exodus of one third of the population. In the 30 years starting in 1926, the plague occurred in Hong Kong almost every year and killed more than 20,000 people. Through maritime traffic, the epidemic spread to the rest of the country after 1894 and eventually spread to British Raj India where about ten million Indians were killed.

There were several reasons for the rapid outbreak and spread of the plague. Firstly, in the early days, Sheung Wan was a Chinese settlement. Houses — in the mountains — had no drainage channels, toilets, or running water. The houses were small and the floors were not paved. Secondly, during the Ching Ming Festival in 1894, many Chinese living in Hong Kong returned to the countryside to tend to family graves, which coincided with the outbreak of the epidemic in Canton and the introduction of bacteria into Hong Kong. Thirdly, in the first four months of 1894, rainfall decreased and soil dried up, accelerating the spread of the plague.

The main preventive measures were setting up plague hospitals and deploying medical staff to treat and isolate plague patients; conducting house-to-house search operations, discovering and transferring plague patients, and cleaning and disinfecting infected houses and areas; and setting up designated cemeteries and assigning a person responsible for transporting and burying the plague dead.

== Disease research ==
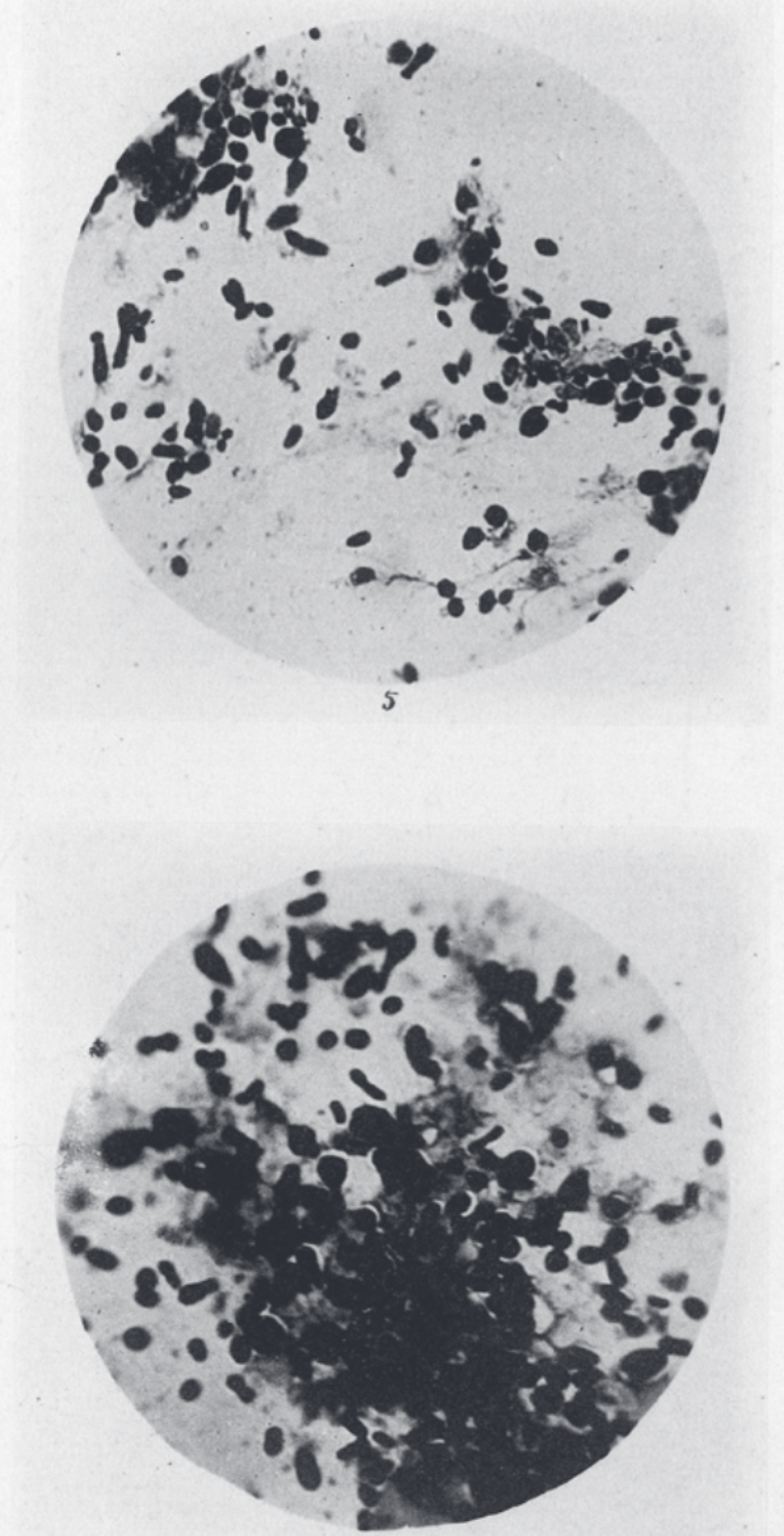
Yersinia pestis isolated by Ricardo Jorge during the 1899 Porto plague outbreak

Researchers working in Asia during the "Third Pandemic" identified plague vectors and the plague bacillus. In 1894, in Hong Kong, Swiss-born French bacteriologist Alexandre Yersin isolated the responsible bacterium (Yersinia pestis, named for Yersin) and determined the common mode of transmission. His discoveries led in time to modern treatment methods, including insecticides, the use of antibiotics and eventually plague vaccines. In 1898, French researcher Paul-Louis Simond demonstrated the role of fleas as a vector.

The disease is caused by a bacterium usually transmitted by the bite of fleas from an infected host, often a black rat. The bacteria are transferred from the blood of infected rats to flea (Xenopsylla cheopis). The bacillus multiplies in the stomach of the flea, blocking it. When the flea next bites a mammal, the consumed blood is regurgitated along with the bacillus into the bloodstream of the bitten animal. Any serious outbreak of plague in humans is preceded by an outbreak in the rodent population. During the outbreak, infected fleas that have lost their normal rodent hosts seek other sources of blood.

The British colonial government in India pressed medical researcher Waldemar Haffkine to develop a plague vaccine. After three months of persistent work with a limited staff, a form for human trials was ready. On 10 January 1897, Haffkine tested it on himself. After the initial test was reported to the authorities, volunteers at the Byculla jail were used in a control test. All inoculated prisoners survived the epidemics, while seven inmates of the control group died. By the turn of the century, the number of inoculees in India alone reached four million. Haffkine was appointed the Director of the Plague Laboratory (now called the Haffkine Institute) in Bombay.

== Medical procedures implemented by new international health communities ==
In the early 1900s, despite the increasing knowledge of germ theory and the rapid growth of scientific communities around the prevention of major disease, there was little the international communities could do other than create standard protocols for how to deal with an outbreak of the plague. In 1897 and 1903, two conventions were held known as International Sanitary Conferences; the first in Venice and the second in Paris, to help deal with threat of the new outbreaks of the bubonic plague. From these conventions was formed an international disease convention supervised by the Office International d'Hygiene Publique (OIHP) in Paris which would be one of the major predecessors of the League of Nations health organization. From these conventions came the standard Protocols used in dealing with the bubonic plague throughout the early 1900s. These protocols were generally summarized as the 3 "I's": Isolation, Incineration, and Inoculation. Isolation is a standard protocol of many modern disease outbreaks, but the usage of incineration was a protocol of disease control used most uniquely for dealing with the bubonic plague. Burning was used often to deal with the Plague as it was believed to be the most effective way to eliminate strains of the disease from places inhabited by the infected. But it was also a problematic technique as it led to the creation of many out-of-control fires that devastated communities, the most notable being the great fire in Honolulu which devastated the Chinatown community there. Inoculation was the usage of newly invented plague vaccines, with some in India being recorded to have an efficacy of over 50%.

== Social implications of the third plague pandemic ==
In many instances, the third plague pandemic either revealed or exacerbated major social conflicts and racial inequalities. Many of the ports infected during the plague were at the time in British colonies. Because of this, the British authorities often ended up enforcing western hygiene and medical practices and radical quarantine measures in countries and provinces such as India, South Africa and Hong Kong.

In India harsh quarantines were initially implemented by the British governments, leading to Indian resentment of quarantine measures. In South Africa, when the plague broke out in Cape Colony, the colonial government forced a large group of Black South Africans to move out of a supposed slum into areas on the outskirts of the city, which historians have argued as a racially motivated move by White South Africans to segregate Blacks into other parts of the city. In Hong Kong the British enforced many locally unfamiliar medical practices, such as floating plague victims out on boats onto the water and cooling plague victims with ice, which scared many Chinese residents of Hong Kong and led to their migrating back to mainland China, which was then even more badly affected by the plague.

Another instance of social harm caused by the response to the plague is the "great fire of Honolulu" in 1900, in which much of Chinatown in Honolulu was burned by the Honolulu Board of Health in order to control the plague, rendering over 7,000 Chinese and Japanese residents homeless. In America when the plague reached San Francisco, the medical board of the city implemented a strict quarantine of the entire Chinatown district after discovering only one case of the plague; this has led historians to question whether this measure was motivated by racial bias among medical professionals.

== See also ==
- List of epidemics and pandemics
- Timeline of plague
  - British Raj India pandemics
