= 2010s in medicine =

This is a list of events associated with medicine in the 2010s. The decade was marked by several events. Longer-lasting events included the continued outflux of Afghan refugees, who were at risk for various health problems, as well as the 2010s Haiti cholera outbreak.

== Decade ==
- As of 2011, Afghanistan maintains its position as the largest source of refugees (a position held for 32 years) with one out of every four refugees being an Afghan and with 95% living in Pakistan or Iran. Refugees are at risk of a variety of health problems, including post-traumatic stress and depression, infectious disease such as tuberculosis and malaria, and consequences of possible torture, rape or trauma.
- From 2010 to 2013, following the 2010 Haiti earthquake, cholera breaks out in Haiti. This outbreak of cholera in Haiti results in more than 7,050 deaths and sickened more than 531,000.

== 2010 ==
- 2010s Haiti cholera outbreak
- Japan foot-and-mouth outbreak
- South Korea foot-and-mouth outbreak
- Zamfara State lead poisoning outbreak

=== February ===
- In response to the UK General Medical Council investigation and findings of fraud, the editors of The Lancet medical journal fully retracted a paper by Andrew Wakefield that sparked the MMR vaccine controversy. The vaccine-autism connection proposed in a paper has been described as "the most damaging medical hoax of the last 100 years".

=== October ===
- 06: The Nobel Prize in Physiology or Medicine is awarded to Robert G. Edwards "for the development of in vitro fertilization".

== 2011 ==
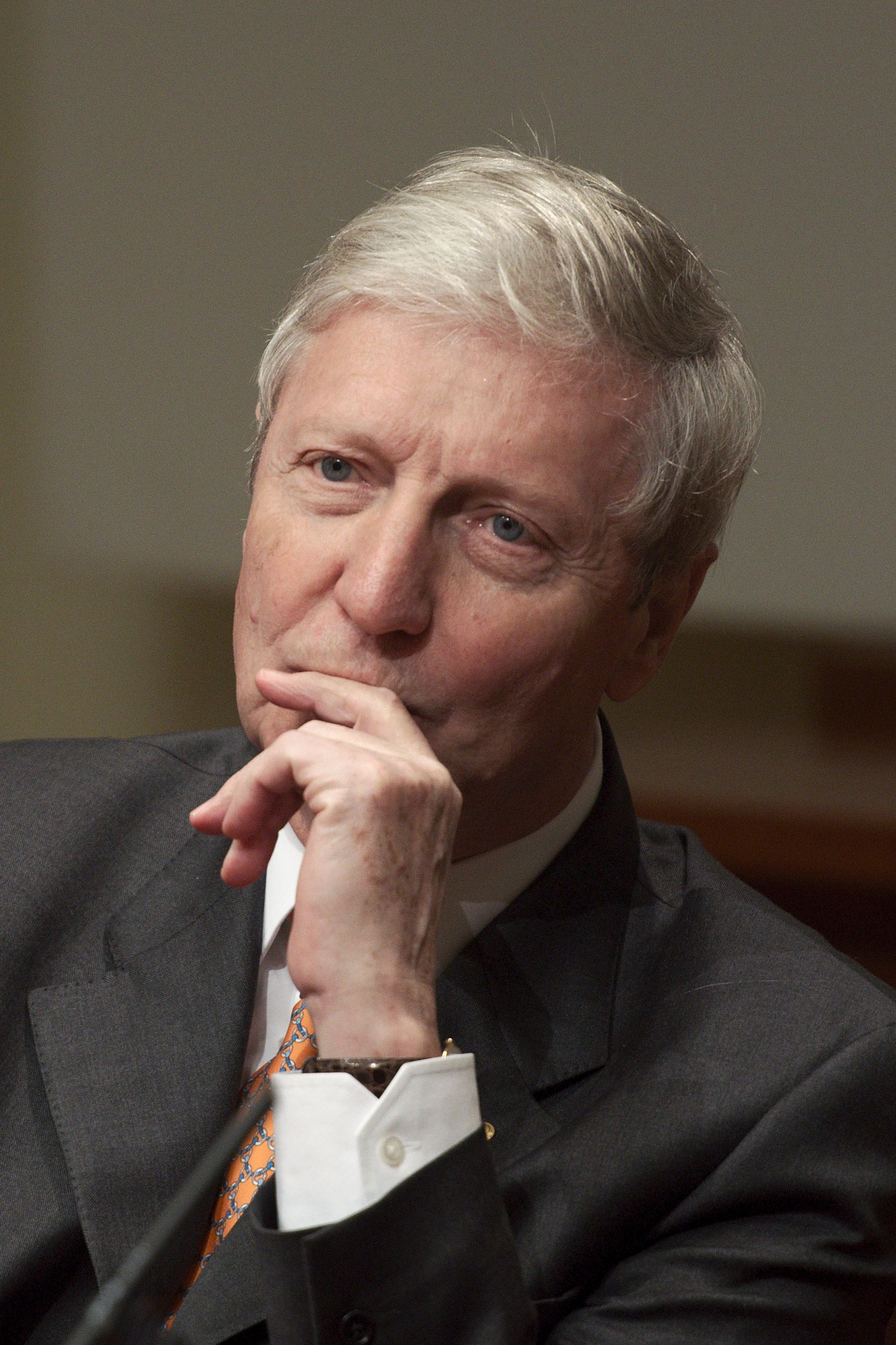
Jules A. Hoffmann, a recipient of the 2011 Nobel Prize in Physiology or Medicine

- 2011 dengue outbreak in Pakistan
- 2011 United States listeriosis outbreak
- 2011 Germany E. coli O104:H4 outbreak

=== October ===
- 03: The Nobel Prize in Physiology or Medicine is jointly awarded to Bruce A. Beutler and Jules A. Hoffmann "for their discoveries concerning the activation of innate immunity" and posthumously to Ralph M. Steinman "for his discovery of the dendritic cell and its role in adaptive immunity".

== 2012 ==
- 2012 outbreak of Salmonella
- 2012 Sierra Leonean cholera outbreak
- 2012 yellow fever outbreak in Darfur, Sudan
- MERS outbreak
- New England Compounding Center meningitis outbreak
- Norovirus GII.4 Sydney
- Quảng Ngãi skin disease outbreak

=== January ===
- 13: India celebrated one year without polio. India had previously been regarded as one of the most difficult countries from which to eliminate polio, due to the high population density and low socioeconomic status in many rural areas.
- Schizophrenia was renamed in South Korea from jungshinbunyeolbyung (mind-split disorder), to johyeonbyung (attunement disorder)
- U.S. pharmaceutical company Gilead Sciences acquires Pharmasset for $11.2 billion, in anticipation of release of the hepatitis C drug sofosbuvir.

=== May ===
- 22: The United States preventive services task force released a guideline advising against routine screening for prostate cancer using the prostate-specific antigen test, concluding that the benefits of the testing outweighs the harms, and sparking a debate about the use of the test.

=== July ===
- In the USA, GlaxoSmithKline settles a court case with the Department of Justice for $3 billion, the largest pharmaceutical fraud settlement to this date, due to several allegations, including fraudulent of marketing several drugs for off-label uses, the antidepressants Paxil and Wellbutrin, and failure to include data in a Food and Drug Administration submission for the diabetic medication Avandia.

=== October ===
- 08: The Nobel Prize in Physiology or Medicine is jointly awarded to John B. Gurdon and Shinya Yamanaka "for the discovery that mature cells can be reprogrammed to become pluripotent".
- 26: The National People's Congress of China passed new mental health laws, recognising the increasing awareness of mental health. One of the major changes is the emphasis that treatment must be voluntary in the majority of cases.

== 2013 ==
- Western African Ebola epidemic
- 2013–2014 chikungunya outbreak
- 2013 dengue outbreak in Singapore
- 2013 Swansea measles epidemic
- 2013–2014 Zika virus outbreaks in Oceania

=== April ===
- 14: The first kidney grown in a rat in vitro in the U.S. was published.

=== May ===
- 01: China signed a new mental health law into effect.
- 18: The psychiatry manual DSM-5 was formally published, revising definitions for a wide range of psychiatric illnesses, including a new definition for autism spectrum disorder and substance use disorder
- 29: Results of a phase 3 study for the first vaccine for enterovirus 71, one cause of hand foot mouth disease, were published, showing a 90% statistically significant efficacy

=== July ===
- 03: A study was published documenting the first human liver grown from stem cells in Japan

=== October ===
- 01: Due to a contentious debate about funding for the Patient Protection and Affordable Care Act the government of the United States entered a period of shutdown, causing 800,000 federal workers to be furloughed. October 1, 2013 was also the first day that many insurance exchanges went online and other sections of the act began to be implemented.
- 07: The Nobel Prize in Physiology or Medicine is jointly awarded to James E. Rothman, Randy W. Schekman, and Thomas C. Südhof "for their discoveries of machinery regulating vesicle traffic, a major transport system in our cells".

== 2014 ==
- 2014–2015 African cholera outbreak
- 2014 Democratic Republic of the Congo Ebola outbreak
- 2014 enterovirus D68 outbreak
- 2014 Macedonia listeriosis outbreak
- 2014 Odisha hepatitis outbreak
- 2014 Portugal legionellosis outbreak
- Disneyland measles outbreak

=== October ===
- 06: The Nobel Prize in Physiology or Medicine is jointly awarded to John O'Keefe, May-Britt Moser and Edvard I. Moser "for their for their discoveries of cells that constitute a positioning system in the brain".

== 2015 ==
- 2015–16 Zika virus epidemic
- 2015 Indian swine flu outbreak
- 2015 dengue outbreak in Taiwan
- 2015 MERS outbreak in South Korea
- 2015 United States H5N2 outbreak
- 2015 United States E. coli outbreak
- Shimla jaundice outbreak
- 2015 Bronx Legionnaires' disease outbreaks

=== October ===
- 05: The Nobel Prize in Physiology or Medicine is jointly awarded to William C. Campbell and Satoshi Ōmura "for their discoveries concerning a novel therapy against infections caused by roundworm parasites" and to Tu Youyou "for her discoveries concerning a novel therapy against Malaria".

== 2016 ==
- 2016–2022 Yemen cholera outbreak
- 2016 Angola and DR Congo yellow fever outbreak
- 2016 United States Elizabethkingia outbreak

=== October ===
- 03: The Nobel Prize in Physiology or Medicine is awarded to Yoshinori Ohsumi "for his discoveries of mechanisms for autophagy".

== 2017 ==
- 2017 Democratic Republic of the Congo Ebola outbreak
- 2017 dengue outbreak in Peshawar
- 2017 dengue outbreak in Sri Lanka
- 2017 Uganda Marburg virus outbreak
- 2017–2018 United States flu season
- 2017–2018 South African listeriosis outbreak

=== October ===
- 02: The Nobel Prize in Physiology or Medicine is jointly awarded to Jeffrey C. Hall, Michael Rosbash and Michael W. Young "for their discoveries of molecular mechanisms controlling the circadian rhythm".

== 2018 ==
- 2018–2019 Zimbabwe cholera outbreak
- 2018 Équateur province Ebola outbreak
- 2018 Madagascar measles outbreak
- 2018 United States adenovirus outbreak
- 2018 Australian rockmelon listeriosis outbreak
- Kivu Ebola epidemic

=== October ===
- 01: The Nobel Prize in Physiology or Medicine is jointly awarded to James P. Allison and Tasuku Honjo "for their discovery of cancer therapy by inhibition of negative immune regulation".

== 2019 ==
- COVID-19 pandemic
- 2019–2020 dengue fever epidemic
- 2019 dengue outbreak in Bangladesh
- 2019 dengue outbreak in Pakistan
- 2019–2020 vaping lung illness outbreak
- 2019 United States hepatitis A outbreak
- 2019–2021 polio outbreak in the Philippines
- 2019–2020 United States flu season
- 2019 Bihar encephalitis outbreak
- 2019 New York measles outbreak
- 2019 Sindh HIV outbreak
- 2019 Cook Islands dengue fever outbreak

=== October ===
- 07: The Nobel Prize in Physiology or Medicine is jointly awarded to William Kaelin Jr., Peter J. Ratcliffe and Gregg L. Semenza "for their discoveries of how cells sense and adapt to oxygen availability".

=== December ===
- 01: The first known case of COVID-19 in a human occurs in mainland China, leading to the COVID-19 pandemic.

== See also ==
- 2000s in medicine
- 2020s in medicine
- Timeline of medicine and medical technology
