= 2021 North Kivu Ebola outbreak =

Disease outbreak in the Democratic Republic of the Congo

2021 North Kivu Ebola
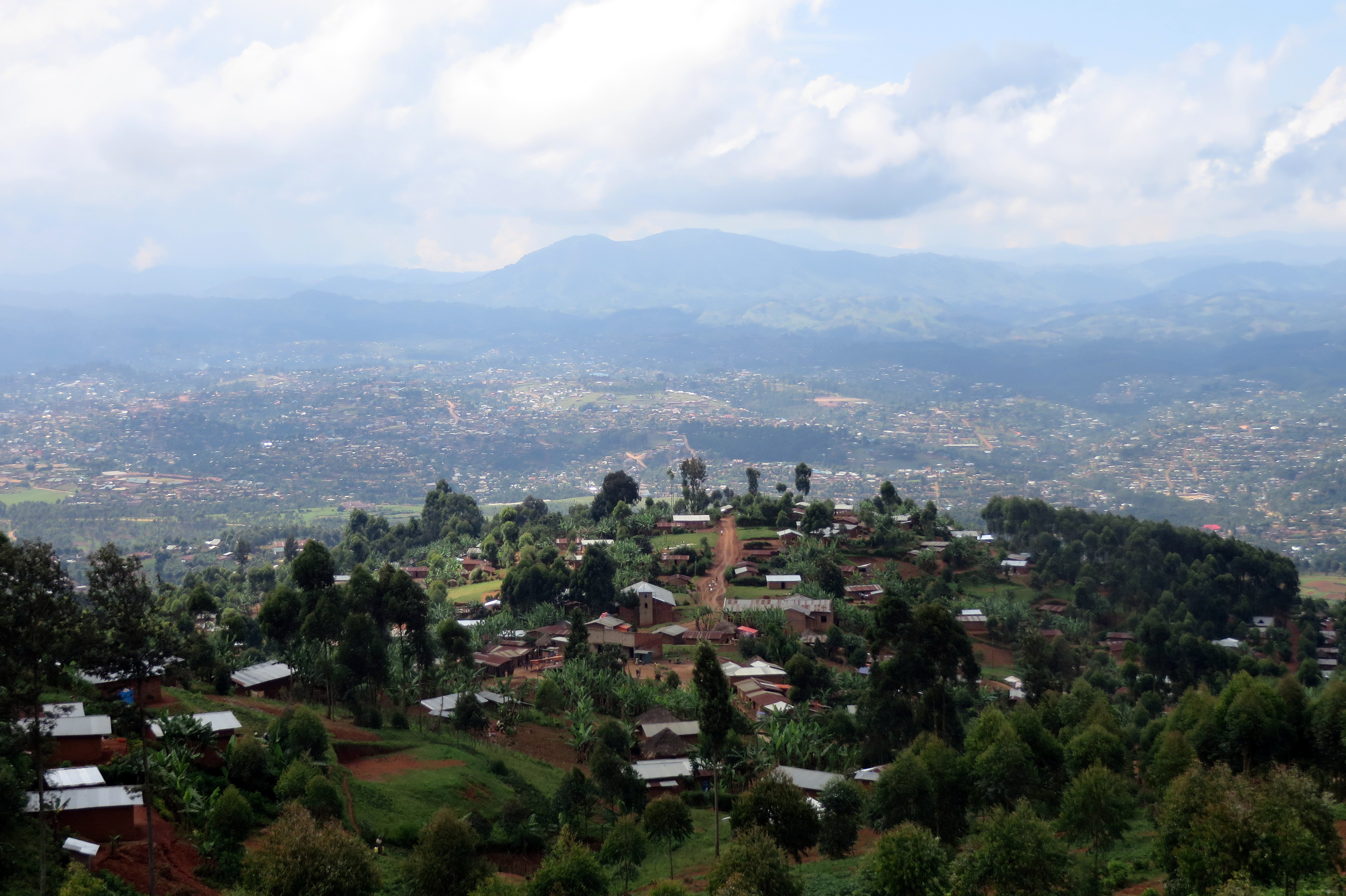
- Butembo, DRC
- Deaths: 6

On 7 February 2021, the Congolese health ministry announced that a new case of Ebola near Butembo, North Kivu had been detected the previous day. The case was a 42-year-old woman who had symptoms of Ebola in Biena on 1 February 2021. A few days after, she died in a hospital in Butembo. The WHO said that more than 70 people who had contact with the woman had been tracked.

On 3 May 2021, the 12th EVD outbreak was declared over, resulting in 12 cases and 6 deaths. Heightened surveillance will continue for 90 days after the declaration, in case of resurgence.

== History ==
Timeline of Ebola outbreaks in the Democratic Republic of the Congo (formerly Zaire) since 1976
^{V}^{・}^{T} Date	Country	Major location	Outbreak information				Source
^{V}^{・}^{T} Date	Country	Major location	Strain	Cases	Deaths	CFR	Source
Aug 1976	Zaire	Yambuku	EBOV	318	280	88%	
Jun 1977	Zaire	Tandala	EBOV	1	1	100%	
May–Jul 1995	Zaire	Kikwit	EBOV	315	254	81%	
Aug–Nov 2007	Democratic Republic of the Congo	Kasai-Occidental	EBOV	264	187	71%	
Dec 2008–Feb 2009	Democratic Republic of the Congo	Kasai-Occidental	EBOV	32	14	45%	
Jun–Nov 2012	Democratic Republic of the Congo	Orientale	BDBV	77	36	47%	
Aug–Nov 2014	Democratic Republic of the Congo	Tshuapa	EBOV	66	49	74%	
May–Jul 2017	Democratic Republic of the Congo	Likati	EBOV	8	4	50%	
Apr–Jul 2018	Democratic Republic of the Congo	Équateur Province	EBOV	54	33	61%	
Aug 2018–June 2020	Democratic Republic of the Congo	Kivu	EBOV	3,470	2,280	66%	
June–Nov 2020	Democratic Republic of the Congo	Équateur Province	EBOV	130	55	42%	
Feb 2021–May 2021	Democratic Republic of the Congo	North Kivu	EBOV	12	6	50%	
April 2022	Democratic Republic of the Congo	Équateur Province	EBOV	5	5	100%	
August 2022	Democratic Republic of the Congo	North Kivu	EBOV	1	1	100%	

== See also ==
- Western African Ebola virus epidemic
- Kivu Ebola epidemic
- Post-Ebola virus syndrome
