= September 21 =

September 21 this year in various calendars
- Monday, 21 September 2026
Akan	Nwonadwo
Armenian	3 Sahmi 1476
Aztec	Tititl 14, 8 Ehēcatl
Babylonian	8 Ululu, 2337 SE
Balinese pawukon	Luang, Pepet, Beteng, Menala, Umanis, Aryang, Coma of Bala, Uma, Ogan, Raksasa
Bengali	6 Ashshin, BS 1433
Chinese	Yang Earth Dog・Heart Mansion; Fire Horse Year, Month 8, Day 11 (Bailu, 2 days until Qiufen)
Common Era	21 September 2026 CE
Coptic	11 Thout, AM 1743
Egyptian	8 Mechir, 2775 NE
Ethiopian	11 Maskaram, 2019 Amätä Məhrät
French Republican	La Fête des Récompenses de l'Année 234 de la République
Gregorian	21 September, AD 2026
Hebrew	10 Tishrei, AM 5787
Hindu	Uttarāṣāḍha・Śobhana; Solar: 5 Āśvina, 1948 SE; Lunisolar: Daśamī, Śukla pakṣa of Bhādrapada, 2083 VE; Rāudra・5127 KY・1,872,839
Icelandic	Mánudagur, 28 Tvímánuður 2026
Islamic	8 Rabi' al-thani, AH 1448 (using tabular method)
ISO week date	2026-W39-1
Japanese	11 Hazuki, Reiwa 8 (Hakuro, 2 days until Shūbun)
Julian	8 September, AD 2026 (AM 7534)
Julian day	2461305
Korean	11 Dakdal, 4359 DE
Maya	13.0.13.17.2; 15 Chen, 8 Ik
Roman	ante diem VI Idus Septembres, MMDCCLXXIX AUC
Solar Hijri	30 Shahrivar, SH 1405
Tibetan	10 khrums, me pho rta 2153 or 1772 or 1000

<<	September					>>
Su	Mo	Tu	We	Th	Fr	Sa
		1	2	3	4	5
6	7	8	9	10	11	12
13	14	15	16	17	18	19
20	21	22	23	24	25	26
27	28	29	30
2026

September 21 in recent years
2026 (Monday)
2025 (Sunday)
2024 (Saturday)
2023 (Thursday)
2022 (Wednesday)
2021 (Tuesday)
2020 (Monday)
2019 (Saturday)
2018 (Friday)
2017 (Thursday)

September 21 is the 264th day of the year (265th in leap years) in the Gregorian calendar; 101 days remain until the end of the year.

== Events ==
=== Pre-1600 ===
- 454 – Western Roman Emperor Valentinian III murders his general Flavius Aetius on instigation of eunuch Heraclius and senator Petronius Maximus.
- 455 – Emperor Avitus enters Italy with a Gallic army and consolidates his power.
- 1170 – Anglo-Norman invasion of Ireland: The Kingdom of Dublin falls to Anglo-Norman invaders.
- 1217 – Livonian Crusade: The Estonian leader Lembitu and Livonian leader Caupo of Turaida are killed in the Battle of St. Matthew's Day.
- 1435 – The Treaty of Arras is promulgated, causing Burgundy to switch sides in the Hundred Years' War.

=== 1601–1900 ===
- 1745 – A British government army led by Sir John Cope is defeated in less than 15 minutes by the Jacobite forces of Prince Charles Edward Stuart.
- 1776 – Part of New York City is burned shortly after being occupied by British forces.
- 1780 – American Revolutionary War: Benedict Arnold gives the British the plans to West Point.
- 1792 – French Revolution: The National Convention abolishes the monarchy.
- 1809 – British Secretary of War Lord Castlereagh and Foreign Secretary George Canning meet in a duel on Putney Heath, with Castlereagh wounding Canning in the thigh.
- 1814 – War of 1812: British forces abandon their unsuccessful siege of Fort Erie.
- 1843 – The crew of schooner Ancud, led by John Williams Wilson, takes possession of the Strait of Magellan on behalf of the Chilean government.
- 1860 – Second Opium War: An Anglo-French force defeats Chinese troops at the Battle of Palikao.
- 1862 – Taiping Rebellion: The Ever Victorious Army defeats Taiping forces at the Battle of Cixi.
- 1896 – Anglo-Egyptian conquest of Sudan: British forces under the command of Horatio Kitchener take Dongola.
- 1898 – Empress Dowager Cixi seizes power and ends the Hundred Days' Reform in China.

=== 1901–present ===
- 1921 – A storage silo in Oppau, Germany, explodes, killing 500–600 people.
- 1933 – Salvador Lutteroth establishes Mexican professional wrestling.
- 1934 – A large typhoon hits western Honshū, Japan, killing more than 3,000 people.
- 1937 – J.R.R. Tolkien's The Hobbit is published for the first time. (September 22 is celebrated by some fans as Hobbit Day, however.)
- 1938 – The Great Hurricane of 1938 makes landfall on Long Island in New York. The death toll is estimated at 500–700 people.
- 1939 – Romanian prime minister Armand Călinescu is assassinated by the Iron Guard.
- 1942 – The Holocaust in Ukraine: On the Jewish holiday of Yom Kippur, Nazis send over 1,000 Jews from Pidhaitsi to Bełżec extermination camp.
- 1942 – The Holocaust in Ukraine: In Dunaivtsi, Ukraine, Nazis murder 2,588 Jews.
- 1942 – The Holocaust in Poland: At the end of Yom Kippur, Germans order Jews to permanently move from Konstantynów to Biała Podlaska.
- 1942 – The Boeing B-29 Superfortress makes its maiden flight.
- 1953 – Lieutenant No Kum-sok, a North Korean pilot, defects to South Korea with his jet fighter.
- 1957 – Pamir, a four-masted barque, was shipwrecked and sank off the Azores during Hurricane Carrie.
- 1964 – Malta gains independence from the United Kingdom, but remains in the Commonwealth.
- 1964 – The North American XB-70 Valkyrie, the world's fastest bomber, makes its maiden flight from Palmdale, California.
- 1965 – The Gambia, Maldives and Singapore are admitted as members of the United Nations.
- 1969 – Mexicana de Aviación Flight 801, a Boeing 727-100 passenger plane, crashes during a landing attempt in Mexico City, killing 27 of the 118 occupants.
- 1971 – Bahrain, Bhutan and Qatar join the United Nations.
- 1972 – Philippine president Ferdinand Marcos begins authoritarian rule by declaring martial law.
- 1976 – Orlando Letelier is assassinated in Washington, D.C. by Michael Townley, linked to the National Intelligence Directorate of Chile.
- 1976 – Seychelles joins the United Nations.
- 1977 – Malév Flight 203 crashes near Urziceni, Romania, killing 29 people.
- 1981 – Belize is granted full independence from the United Kingdom.
- 1981 – Sandra Day O'Connor is unanimously approved by the U.S. Senate as the first female Supreme Court justice.
- 1984 – Brunei joins the United Nations.
- 1991 – Armenia gains independence from the Soviet Union.
- 1993 – Russian president Boris Yeltsin triggers a constitutional crisis when he suspends parliament and scraps the constitution.
- 1993 – A Transair Georgian Airlines Tu-134 is shot down by a missile in the Black Sea near Sokhumi, Georgia.
- 1995 – MIAT Flight 557 crashes near Mörön, Mongolia, killing 41 people.
- 1996 – The Defense of Marriage Act is passed by the United States Congress.
- 1997 – St. Olaf's Church, a stone church from the 16th century in Tyrvää, Finland, is burnt down by a burglar.
- 1999 – The 7.7-magnitude Chi-Chi earthquake strikes central Taiwan, killing 2,400 people.
- 2001 – America: A Tribute to Heroes is broadcast by over 35 network and cable channels, raising over $200 million for the victims of the September 11 attacks.
- 2001 – Ross Parker is murdered in Peterborough, England, by a gang of ten British Pakistani youths.
- 2003 – The Galileo spacecraft is terminated by sending it into Jupiter's atmosphere.
- 2012 – Three Egyptian militants open fire on a group of Israeli soldiers in a southern Israel cross-border attack.
- 2013 – Al-Shabaab Islamic militants attack the Westgate shopping mall in Kenya, killing at least 67 people.
- 2015 – Adventist Health System agreed to pay $118.7 million to settle allegations of fraud. It was the largest a hospital network has ever paid.
- 2018 – LGBT rights activist Zak Kostopoulos is beaten to death on a busy street in Athens.
- 2019 – A 5.6 M_{w} earthquake shakes the Albanian port of Durrës. Forty-nine people are injured in the capital, Tirana.

== Births ==
=== Pre-1600 ===
- 580 – Pope Vitalian (died 672)
- 953 – Abu Ishaq Ibrahim, Buyid prince
- 1051 – Bertha of Savoy (died 1087)
- 1371 – Frederick I, Elector of Brandenburg (died 1440)
- 1407 – Leonello d'Este, Marquis of Ferrara, Italian noble (died 1450)
- 1411 – Richard of York, 3rd Duke of York, English politician, Lord Protector of England (died 1460)
- 1415 – Frederick III, Holy Roman Emperor (died 1493)
- 1428 – Jingtai Emperor of China (died 1457)
- 1433 – Guillaume Fichet, French scholar and academic (died 1480)
- 1452 – Girolamo Savonarola, Italian priest and philosopher (died 1498)
- 1457 – Hedwig Jagiellon, Duchess of Bavaria, Polish princess (died 1502)
- 1552 – Barbara Longhi, Italian painter (died 1638)
- 1559 – Cigoli, Italian painter and architect (died 1613)

=== 1601–1900 ===
- 1629 – Philip Howard, English cardinal (died 1694)
- 1640 – Philippe I, Duke of Orléans, younger son of Louis XIII of France and his wife (died 1701)
- 1645 – Louis Jolliet, Canadian explorer (died 1700)
- 1706 – Polyxena of Hesse-Rotenburg (died 1735)
- 1758 – Christopher Gore, American soldier, lawyer, and politician, 8th Governor of Massachusetts (died 1827)
- 1760 – Ivan Dmitriev, Russian poet and politician, Minister of Justice for Imperial Russia (died 1837)
- 1761 – Antoine Barnave, French politician and orator (died 1793)
- 1776 – John Fitchett, English poet (died 1838)
- 1819 – Princess Louise Marie Thérèse of Artois (died 1864)
- 1840 – Murad V, Ottoman sultan (died 1904)
- 1842 – Abdul Hamid II, 34th Sultan of the Ottoman Empire (died 1918)
- 1846 – Mihály Kolossa, Hungarian-Slovene author and poet (died 1906)
- 1849 – Maurice Barrymore, American actor (died 1905)
- 1851 – Fanny Searls, American biologist (died 1939)
- 1853 – Heike Kamerlingh Onnes, Dutch physicist and academic, Nobel Prize laureate (died 1926)
- 1859 – Francesc Macià, Catalan colonel and politician, 122nd President of Catalonia (died 1933)
- 1862 – James E. Talmage, English-American religious leader and author (died 1933)
- 1863 – John Bunny, American actor (died 1915)
- 1866 – Charles Nicolle, French-Tunisian microbiologist and academic, Nobel Prize laureate (died 1936)
- 1866 – H. G. Wells, English novelist, historian, and critic (died 1946)
- 1867 – Charles Bathurst, 1st Viscount Bledisloe, English politician, 4th Governor-General of New Zealand (died 1958)
- 1867 – Henry L. Stimson, American colonel, lawyer, and politician, 46th United States Secretary of State (died 1950)
- 1872 – Henry Tingle Wilde, English chief officer on the RMS Titanic (died 1912)
- 1873 – Papa Jack Laine, American drummer and bandleader (died 1966)
- 1874 – Gustav Holst, English composer and educator (died 1934)
- 1878 – Peter McWilliam, Scottish-English footballer and manager (died 1951)
- 1882 – Geevarghese Ivanios, Indian metropolitan (died 1953)
- 1884 – Dénes Kőnig, Hungarian mathematician and theorist (died 1944)
- 1890 – Max Immelmann, German lieutenant and pilot (died 1916)
- 1890 – Charles William Train, English sergeant, Victoria Cross recipient (died 1965)
- 1893 – Erna Scheffler, German lawyer and justice of the Federal Constitutional Court (died 1983)
- 1894 – Anton Piëch, Austrian lawyer and businessman (died 1952)
- 1898 – Frances Mary Albrier, American civil rights activist (died 1987)
- 1899 – Frederick Coutts, Scottish 8th General of The Salvation Army (died 1986)

=== 1901–present ===
- 1902 – Luis Cernuda, Spanish poet and critic (died 1963)
- 1902 – Allen Lane, English publisher, founded Penguin Books (died 1970)
- 1902 – Howie Morenz, Canadian ice hockey player (died 1937)
- 1903 – Preston Tucker, American engineer and businessman, designed the Tucker Sedan (died 1956)
- 1904 – Hans Hartung, German-French painter (died 1989)
- 1905 – Robert Lebel, Canadian businessman and politician (died 1999)
- 1906 – Henry Beachell, American biologist and botanist (died 2006)
- 1909 – Kwame Nkrumah, Ghanaian educator and politician, 1st President of Ghana (died 1972)
- 1910 – Meinrad Schütter, Swiss composer (died 2006)
- 1912 – Chuck Jones, American animator, producer, and screenwriter (died 2002)
- 1912 – György Sándor, Hungarian pianist and composer (died 2005)
- 1916 – Françoise Giroud, Swiss-French journalist and politician, French Minister of Culture (died 2003)
- 1917 – Phyllis Nicolson, English mathematician and academic (died 1968)
- 1918 – John Gofman, American physicist, chemist, and biologist (died 2007)
- 1918 – Karl Slover, American actor (died 2011)
- 1918 – Juan José Arreola, Mexican writer and academic (died 2001)
- 1919 – Mario Bunge, Argentinian-Canadian physicist and philosopher (died 2020)
- 1919 – Herman Fowlkes, Jr., American trumpet player and educator (died 1993)
- 1919 – Fazlur Rahman Malik, Pakistani philosopher and scholar (died 1988)
- 1920 – Kenneth McAlpine, British race car driver (died 2023)
- 1921 – John McHale, American baseball player and manager (died 2008)
- 1923 – Fred Hunt, British jazz pianist (died 1986)
- 1924 – Hermann Buhl, Austrian mountaineer (died 1957)
- 1926 – Don Dunstan, Fijian-Australian lawyer and politician, 35th Premier of South Australia (died 1999)
- 1926 – Donald A. Glaser, American physicist and neurobiologist, Nobel Prize laureate (died 2013)
- 1926 – Fereydoon Moshiri, Iranian poet and critic (died 2000)
- 1929 – Sándor Kocsis, Hungarian footballer and manager (died 1979)
- 1929 – Edgar Valter, Estonian author and illustrator (died 2006)
- 1929 – Bernard Williams, English-Italian philosopher and academic (died 2003)
- 1930 – John Morgan, Welsh-Canadian actor and screenwriter (died 2004)
- 1930 – Bob Stokoe, English footballer and manager (died 2004)
- 1931 – Larry Hagman, American actor, director, and producer (died 2012)
- 1932 – Shirley Conran, English journalist and author (died 2024)
- 1932 – Marjorie Fletcher, English Director of the Women's Royal Naval Service (died 2008)
- 1932 – Don Preston, American keyboard player and composer
- 1933 – Allan Jeans, Australian footballer and coach (died 2011)
- 1933 – Dick Simon, American race car driver
- 1934 – Leonard Cohen, Canadian singer-songwriter and poet (died 2016)
- 1934 – María Rubio, Mexican actress (died 2018)
- 1935 – Jimmy Armfield, English footballer and manager (died 2018)
- 1935 – Henry Gibson, American actor (died 2009)
- 1936 – Ian Albery, English manager and producer
- 1936 – Dickey Lee, American pop-country singer-songwriter and guitarist
- 1936 – Yury Luzhkov, Russian soldier and politician, 2nd Mayor of Moscow (died 2019)
- 1936 – Diane Rehm, American journalist and radio host
- 1937 – John D'Amico, Canadian ice hockey player and referee (died 2005)
- 1938 – Doug Moe, American basketball player and coach (died 2026)
- 1938 – Olu Falae, Nigerian politician and government official
- 1939 – Agnivesh, Indian philosopher, academic, and politician (died 2020)
- 1940 – Ron Fenton, English footballer, coach, and manager (died 2013)
- 1940 – Hermann Knoflacher, Austrian engineer and academic
- 1940 – Bill Kurtis, American journalist and producer
- 1941 – Jack Brisco, American wrestler and manager (died 2010)
- 1941 – R. James Woolsey, Jr., American scholar and diplomat, 16th Director of Central Intelligence
- 1942 – Sam McDowell, American baseball player
- 1943 – David Hood, American session bassist and trombone player
- 1943 – Jerry Bruckheimer, American film and television producer
- 1944 – Steve Beshear, American lawyer and politician, 61st Governor of Kentucky
- 1944 – Marcus Binney, English historian and author
- 1944 – Fannie Flagg, American actress, comedian, and author
- 1944 – Hamilton Jordan, American politician, 8th White House Chief of Staff (died 2008)
- 1944 – Bobby Tench, English singer-songwriter and guitarist (died 2024)
- 1945 – Richard Childress, American race car driver and businessman
- 1945 – Shaw Clifton, Northern Irish 18th General of The Salvation Army (died 2023)
- 1945 – Kay Ryan, American poet and educator
- 1946 – Rose Garrard, English sculptor and author
- 1946 – Moritz Leuenberger, Swiss lawyer and politician, 87th President of the Swiss Confederation
- 1946 – Mart Siimann, Estonian psychologist and politician, 12th Prime Minister of Estonia
- 1947 – Don Felder, American musician and songwriter
- 1947 – Keith Harris, English ventriloquist and singer (died 2015)
- 1947 – Rupert Hine, English musician, songwriter, and record producer (died 2020)
- 1947 – Stephen King, American author and screenwriter
- 1947 – Ed Nimmervoll, Austrian-Australian journalist, historian, and author (died 2014)
- 1947 – Marsha Norman, American playwright and author
- 1948 – Jack Dromey, English union leader and politician (died 2022)
- 1948 – Mitsuo Momota, Japanese wrestler
- 1948 – John B. O'Reilly Jr., American politician (died 2025)
- 1949 – Henry Butler, American pianist and photographer (died 2018)
- 1949 – Artis Gilmore, American basketball player and radio host
- 1949 – Odilo Scherer, Brazilian cardinal
- 1950 – Charles Clarke, English economist and politician, Secretary of State for Education
- 1950 – Bill Murray, American actor, comedian, producer, and screenwriter
- 1951 – Bruce Arena, American soccer player and manager
- 1951 – Aslan Maskhadov, Chechen general and politician, 3rd President of the Chechen Republic of Ichkeria (died 2005)
- 1952 – Dave Gregory, English guitarist and keyboard player
- 1952 – John Taylor, Baron Taylor of Warwick, English lawyer and politician
- 1953 – Arie Luyendyk, Dutch race car driver and sportscaster
- 1953 – Reinhard Marx, German cardinal
- 1954 – Shinzo Abe, Japanese lawyer and politician, 90th Prime Minister of Japan (died 2022)
- 1954 – Julia Grant, British transgender activist (died 2019)
- 1954 – Thomas S. Ray, American ecologist and academic
- 1954 – Phil "Philthy Animal" Taylor, English rock drummer (died 2015)
- 1955 – Richard Hieb, American engineer and astronaut
- 1955 – Israel Katz, Israeli politician
- 1955 – Mika Kaurismäki, Finnish director, producer, and screenwriter
- 1956 – Jack Givens, American basketball player and sportscaster
- 1956 – Marta Kauffman, American screenwriter and producer
- 1956 – Ricky Morton, American wrestler
- 1957 – Ethan Coen, American director, producer, and screenwriter
- 1957 – Mark Levin, American lawyer, radio host, and author
- 1957 – Sidney Moncrief, American basketball player and coach
- 1957 – Kevin Rudd, Australian politician and diplomat, 26th Prime Minister of Australia
- 1958 – Rick Mahorn, American basketball player and coach
- 1958 – Simon Mayo, English radio host
- 1959 – Crin Antonescu, Romanian educator and politician, former interim president of Romania
- 1959 – Andrzej Buncol, Polish footballer
- 1959 – Dave Coulier, American actor, comedian, producer, and screenwriter
- 1959 – Danny Cox, English-American baseball player and coach
- 1959 – Corinne Drewery, English singer-songwriter and fashion designer
- 1960 – David James Elliott, Canadian-American actor and director
- 1960 – Masoumeh Ebtekar, Iranian journalist, politician and scientist, first woman Vice President of Iran
- 1960 – Kelley Eskridge, American author and screenwriter
- 1960 – Musalia Mudavadi, Kenyan politician and Former Deputy Prime Minister
- 1960 – Graham Southern, English art dealer and gallery owner
- 1960 – Maurizio Cattelan, Italian sculptor
- 1961 – Billy Collins, Jr., American boxer (died 1984)
- 1961 – Dan Borislow, American businessman and inventor (died 2014)
- 1961 – Serena Scott Thomas, English actress and producer
- 1961 – Nancy Travis, American actress and producer
- 1962 – Rob Morrow, American actor
- 1963 – Curtly Ambrose, Antiguan cricketer and bass player
- 1963 – Cecil Fielder, American baseball player and manager
- 1963 – Angus Macfadyen, Scottish actor and screenwriter
- 1963 – Mamoru Samuragochi, Japanese composer
- 1963 – Trevor Steven, English footballer
- 1963 – David J. Wales, British academic and educator
- 1964 – Jorge Drexler, Uruguayan singer-songwriter
- 1964 – Lester Quitzau, Canadian guitarist
- 1965 – Frédéric Beigbeder, French author and critic
- 1965 – Cheryl Hines, American actress
- 1965 – Johanna Vuoksenmaa, Finnish director and screenwriter
- 1966 – Kerrin Lee-Gartner, Canadian skier and journalist
- 1967 – Faith Hill, American singer-songwriter, producer, and actress
- 1967 – Suman Pokhrel, Nepali poet, lyricist and playwright
- 1967 – Tyler Stewart, Canadian drummer
- 1968 – Kevin Buzzard, British mathematician
- 1968 – David Jude Jolicoeur, American rapper, songwriter, and producer (died 2023)
- 1968 – Ricki Lake, American actress, producer, and talk show host
- 1969 – Anne Burrell, American chef and television host (died 2025)
- 1969 – Jason Christiansen, American baseball player
- 1969 – Curtis Leschyshyn, Canadian ice hockey player and sportscaster
- 1969 – Billy Porter, American actor and singer
- 1970 – Rob Benedict, American actor, screenwriter, and musician
- 1970 – Melissa Ferrick, American singer-songwriter and guitarist
- 1970 – Samantha Power, Irish-American journalist, academic, and diplomat, 28th United States Ambassador to the United Nations
- 1971 – John Crawley, English cricketer and academic
- 1971 – James Lesure, Americana actor
- 1971 – Alfonso Ribeiro, American actor, director, and comedian
- 1971 – Luke Wilson, American actor, director, and screenwriter
- 1972 – Olivia Bonamy, French actress
- 1972 – Liam Gallagher, English singer-songwriter
- 1972 – Jon Kitna, American football player and coach
- 1973 – Vanessa Grigoriadis, American journalist and author
- 1973 – Virginia Ruano Pascual, Spanish tennis player
- 1973 – Oswaldo Sánchez, Mexican footballer
- 1974 – Özgür Özel, Turkish pharmacist and politician
- 1974 – Katharine Merry, English former sprinter
- 1974 – Bryce Drew, American basketball player and coach
- 1974 – Andy Todd, English footballer and manager
- 1975 – Doug Davis, American baseball player
- 1975 – Craig Thompson, American graphic novelist
- 1976 – Jonas Bjerre, Danish singer-songwriter and guitarist
- 1976 – Poul Hübertz, Danish footballer and manager
- 1977 – Kārlis Lācis, Latvian pianist and composer
- 1977 – Andre Pärn, Estonian basketball player
- 1977 – Kohei Sato, Japanese wrestler
- 1977 – Brian Tallet, American baseball player
- 1978 – Paulo Costanzo, Canadian actor, director, and producer
- 1978 – Luke Godden, Australian footballer
- 1978 – Doug Howlett, New Zealand rugby player
- 1979 – James Allan, Scottish singer-songwriter and guitarist
- 1979 – Richard Dunne, Irish footballer
- 1979 – Chris Gayle, Jamaican cricketer
- 1979 – Julian Gray, English footballer
- 1979 – Monika Merl, German runner
- 1980 – Nyree Kindred, Welsh swimmer
- 1980 – Tomas Scheckter, South African race car driver
- 1980 – Autumn Reeser, American actress
- 1980 – Kareena Kapoor, Indian actress
- 1981 – Nicole Richie, American actress, fashion designer, and author
- 1981 – Sarah Whatmore, English singer-songwriter
- 1982 – Eduardo Azevedo, Brazilian race car driver
- 1982 – Dominic Perrottet, Australian politician, 46th Premier of New South Wales
- 1982 – Christos Tapoutos, Greek basketball player
- 1982 – Rowan Vine, English footballer
- 1983 – Ndiss Kaba Badji, Senegalese athlete
- 1983 – Fernando Cavenaghi, Argentine footballer
- 1983 – Francesco Dracone, Italian race car driver
- 1983 – Scott Evans, American actor
- 1983 – Anna Favella, Italian actress
- 1983 – Maggie Grace, American actress
- 1983 – Cristian Hidalgo, Spanish footballer
- 1983 – Greg Jennings, American football player
- 1983 – Joseph Mazzello, American actor, director, producer, and screenwriter
- 1983 – Anna Meares, Australian track cyclist
- 1983 – Reggie Nelson, American football player
- 1983 – Rafael Marques Pinto, Brazilian footballer
- 1984 – Dwayne Bowe, American football player
- 1984 – Jason Citron, American businessman, co-founded Discord
- 1984 – Ahna O'Reilly, American actress
- 1984 – Ben Wildman-Tobriner, American swimmer
- 1984 – Wale, American rapper
- 1985 – Justin Durant, American football player
- 1986 – Faris Badwan, English singer-songwriter
- 1986 – Lindsey Stirling, American violinist and composer
- 1987 – Jimmy Clausen, American football player
- 1987 – Anthony Don, Australian rugby league player
- 1987 – Marcelo Estigarribia, Paraguayan footballer
- 1987 – Ryan Guzman, American actor and model
- 1987 – Murilo Maccari, Brazilian footballer
- 1987 – Ashley Paris, American basketball player
- 1987 – Courtney Paris, American basketball player
- 1987 – Michał Pazdan, Polish footballer
- 1987 – Ivelisse Vélez, Puerto Rican wrestler
- 1988 – Doug Baldwin, American football player
- 1988 – Bilawal Bhutto Zardari, Pakistani politician
- 1989 – Jason Derulo, American singer-songwriter
- 1989 – Sandor Earl, Australian rugby league player
- 1989 – Manny Harris, American basketball player
- 1989 – Emma Watkins, Australian singer and actress
- 1990 – Al-Farouq Aminu, American basketball player
- 1990 – Danny Batth, English footballer
- 1990 – Rob Cross, English darts player
- 1990 – Ivan Dorschner, American-Filipino model and actor
- 1990 – Sam Kasiano, New Zealand rugby league player
- 1990 – Allison Scagliotti, American actress and musician
- 1990 – Christian Serratos, American actress
- 1991 – Anastassia Kovalenko, Estonian motorcycle racer
- 1991 – Carlos Martínez, Dominican baseball player
- 1992 – Kim Jong-dae, South Korean singer-songwriter
- 1992 – Rodrigo Godínez, Mexican footballer
- 1992 – Devyn Marble, American basketball player
- 1993 – Kirsty Gilmour, Scottish badminton player
- 1993 – Kwon Mina, South Korean singer and actress
- 1993 – Ante Rebić, Croatian footballer
- 1994 – Devin Williams, American baseball player
- 1995 – Bruno Caboclo, Brazilian basketball player
- 1998 – Máscara de Bronce, Mexican wrestler
- 1998 – Yainer Díaz, Dominican baseball player
- 1999 – Alexander Isak, Eritrean-Swedish professional footballer
- 1999 – Wang Junkai, Chinese singer
- 1999 – Lizzy McAlpine, American singer-songwriter
- 2006 – Alisha Palmowski, British female racing driver

== Deaths ==
=== Pre-1600 ===
- 19 BC – Virgil, Roman poet (born 70 BC)
- 454 – Flavius Aetius, Roman general and politician (born 396)
- 687 – Pope Conon (born 630)
- 1026 – Otto-William, Count of Burgundy
- 1217 – Lembitu, Estonian king and military leader
- 1217 – Caupo of Turaida
- 1235 – Andrew II of Hungary (born 1175)
- 1256 – William of Kilkenny, Lord Chancellor of England
- 1327 – Edward II of England (born 1284)
- 1397 – Richard FitzAlan, 11th Earl of Arundel, English admiral (born 1346)
- 1558 – Charles V, Holy Roman Emperor (born 1500)
- 1576 – Gerolamo Cardano, Italian mathematician, physician, and astrologer (born 1501)
- 1586 – Antoine Perrenot de Granvelle, French cardinal and diplomat (born 1517)

=== 1601–1900 ===
- 1629 – Jan Pieterszoon Coen, Governor-General of the Dutch East Indies (born 1587)
- 1637 – William V, Landgrave of Hesse-Kassel (born 1602)
- 1643 – Emperor Hong Taiji of China (born 1592)
- 1709 – Ivan Mazepa, Ukrainian statesman, Hetman of Zaporizhian Host (born 1639)
- 1719 – Johann Heinrich Acker, German historian and academic (born 1647)
- 1743 – Jai Singh II, Indian king (born 1688)
- 1748 – John Balguy, English philosopher and author (born 1686)
- 1796 – François Séverin Marceau-Desgraviers, French general (born 1769)
- 1798 – George Read, American lawyer and politician, 3rd Governor of Delaware (born 1733)
- 1812 – Emanuel Schikaneder, German actor and playwright (born 1751)
- 1832 – Walter Scott, Scottish novelist, playwright, and poet (born 1771)
- 1860 – Arthur Schopenhauer, German philosopher and author (born 1788)
- 1874 – Jean-Baptiste Élie de Beaumont, French geologist and engineer (born 1798)
- 1880 – Manuel Montt, Chilean scholar and politician, 6th President of Chile (born 1809)

=== 1901–present ===
- 1904 – Chief Joseph, American tribal leader (born 1840)
- 1905 – Nikolay Benardos, Ukrainian inventor (born 1842)
- 1906 – Samuel Arnold, American conspirator (born 1838)
- 1926 – Léon Charles Thévenin, French engineer (born 1857)
- 1933 – Kenji Miyazawa, Japanese author and poet (born 1896)
- 1937 – Osgood Perkins (actor, born 1892), American actor (born 1892)
- 1938 – Ivana Brlić-Mažuranić, Croatian author and poet (born 1874)
- 1939 – Armand Călinescu, Romanian economist and politician, 39th Prime Minister of Romania (born 1893)
- 1942 – John Symes, English cricketer (born 1879)
- 1944 – Alexander Koshetz, Ukrainian choral conductor, arranger, composer (born 1875)
- 1944 – Artur Phleps, Romanian general (born 1881)
- 1947 – Harry Carey, American actor, director, producer, and screenwriter (born 1878)
- 1953 – Necmettin Sadak, Turkish publisher and politician, 10th Turkish Minister of Foreign Affairs (born 1890)
- 1954 – Mikimoto Kōkichi, Japanese businessman (born 1858)
- 1956 – Bill Struth, Scottish footballer and manager (born 1875)
- 1957 – Haakon VII of Norway (born 1872)
- 1958 – Peter Whitehead, English racing driver (born 1914)
- 1962 – Bo Carter, American singer-songwriter and guitarist (born 1892)
- 1963 – Paulino Masip, Spanish author, playwright, and screenwriter (born 1899)
- 1964 – Josef Müller, Croatian entomologist (born 1880)
- 1966 – Paul Reynaud, French lawyer and politician, 118th Prime Minister of France (born 1878)
- 1971 – Bernardo Houssay, Argentinian physiologist and physician, Nobel Prize laureate (born 1887)
- 1972 – Henry de Montherlant, French essayist, novelist, and dramatist (born 1896)
- 1974 – Walter Brennan, American actor (born 1894)
- 1974 – Jacqueline Susann, American author and actress (born 1918)
- 1975 – Bedri Rahmi Eyüboğlu, Turkish painter and poet (born 1911)
- 1976 – Benjamin Graham, British-American economist, professor, and investor (born 1894)
- 1976 – Orlando Letelier, Chilean economist and politician, Minister of Foreign Affairs for Chile (born 1932)
- 1982 – Ivan Bagramyan, Russian general (born 1897)
- 1983 – Birgit Tengroth, Swedish actor (born 1915)
- 1983 – Xavier Zubiri, Basque philosopher (born 1898)
- 1985 – Gu Long, Chinese author and screenwriter (born 1937)
- 1987 – Jaco Pastorius, American bass player, composer, and producer (born 1951)
- 1989 – Rajini Thiranagama, Sri Lankan physician and academic (born 1954)
- 1990 – Takis Kanellopoulos, Greek director, producer, and screenwriter (born 1933)
- 1991 – Gordon Bashford, English engineer (born 1916)
- 1992 – Tarachand Barjatya, Indian film producer, founded Rajshri Productions (born 1914)
- 1995 – Rudy Perpich, American dentist and politician, 34th Governor of Minnesota (born 1928)
- 1998 – Florence Griffith Joyner, American sprinter (born 1959)
- 2000 – Jacques Flynn, Canadian lawyer and politician, 35th Canadian Minister of Justice (born 1915)
- 2000 – Leonid Rogozov, Russian physician and surgeon (born 1934)
- 2002 – Robert L. Forward, American physicist and science fiction author (born 1932)
- 2006 – Tasos Athanasiadis, Greek author (born 1913)
- 2007 – Hallgeir Brenden, Norwegian skier (born 1929)
- 2007 – Alice Ghostley, American actress (born 1923)
- 2009 – Robert Ginty, American actor, director, and screenwriter (born 1948)
- 2011 – Jun Henmi, Japanese author and poet (born 1939)
- 2012 – José Curbelo, Cuban-American pianist and manager (born 1917)
- 2012 – Yehuda Elkana, Israeli historian and philosopher (born 1934)
- 2012 – Sven Hassel, Danish-German soldier and author (born 1917)
- 2012 – Bill King, English commander, sailor, and author (born 1910)
- 2012 – Tom Umphlett, American baseball player and manager (born 1930)
- 2013 – Kofi Awoonor, Ghanaian author, poet, and diplomat (born 1935)
- 2013 – Michel Brault, Canadian director, producer, and screenwriter (born 1928)
- 2013 – Harl H. Haas, Jr., American lawyer, jurist, and politician (born 1932)
- 2013 – Walter Wallmann, German lawyer and politician, Minister-President of Hesse (born 1932)
- 2013 – Ko Wierenga, Dutch lawyer and politician (born 1933)
- 2014 – Michael Harari, Israeli intelligence officer (born 1927)
- 2014 – Caldwell Jones, American basketball player and coach (born 1950)
- 2014 – Sheldon Patinkin, American director and playwright (born 1935)
- 2015 – Yoram Gross, Polish-Australian director and producer (born 1926)
- 2015 – Ray Warleigh, Australian-English saxophonist and flute player (born 1938)
- 2015 – Richard Williamson, American footballer and coach (born 1941)
- 2018 – Trần Đại Quang, President of Vietnam (born 1956)
- 2018 – Vitaliy Masol, Ukrainian Former Prime Minister (born 1928)
- 2020 – Arthur Ashkin, American scientist and Nobel laureate (born 1922)
- 2021 – Willie Garson, American actor (born 1964)
- 2022 – Raju Srivastav, Indian comedian, actor and politician (born 1963)
- 2023 – Walewska Oliveira, Brazilian volleyball player and Olympic champion (born 1979)
- 2024 – Raquel Blandón, Guatemalan lawyer and activist, First Lady of Guatemala (born 1943)
- 2024 – Benny Golson, American saxophonist and composer (born 1929)
- 2024 – Eddie Low, New Zealand country singer and musician (born 1943)
- 2024 – Mercury Morris, American football player (born 1947)
- 2026 – Angry Anderson, Australian singer and actor (born 1947)
- 2026 – Terry Denton, Australian author and illustrator (born 1950)

== Holidays and observances ==
- Autumnal equinox observances in the Northern Hemisphere, vernal equinox observances in the Southern Hemisphere (see September 22):
  - Spring Day (Argentina)
- Christian feast day:
  - Cadoc
  - Ephigenia of Ethiopia
  - Laurent-Joseph-Marius Imbert (one of the Korean Martyrs)
  - Matthew the Evangelist (Western Church)
  - Maura of Troyes
  - Nativity of the Theotokos (Eastern Orthodox Church, Julian calendar)
  - September 21 (Eastern Orthodox liturgics)
- Arbor Day (Brazil)
- Commemoration of the Declaration of Martial Law (Philippines)
- Customs Service Day (Poland)
- Founder's Day and National Volunteer Day (Ghana)
- Independence Day, celebrates the independence of Armenia from the Soviet Union in 1991.
- Independence Day, celebrates the independence of Belize from the United Kingdom in 1981.
- Independence Day, celebrates the independence of Malta from the United Kingdom in 1964.
- International Day of Peace (International)
- Student's Day (Bolivia)
- Victory over the Golden Horde in the Battle of Kulikovo (Russia)

== Other ==
- In the popular 1978 song "September" by Earth, Wind & Fire, the date is mentioned in the lyric "Do you remember the 21st night of September?" Reference to this date has gained popularity due to the song's spread as an internet meme.
