= National Sanitation Day (Ghana) =

- Official name: National Sanitation Day
- Observed by: residents in Ghana
- Significance: Clean-up exercise across Ghana
- Frequency: monthly

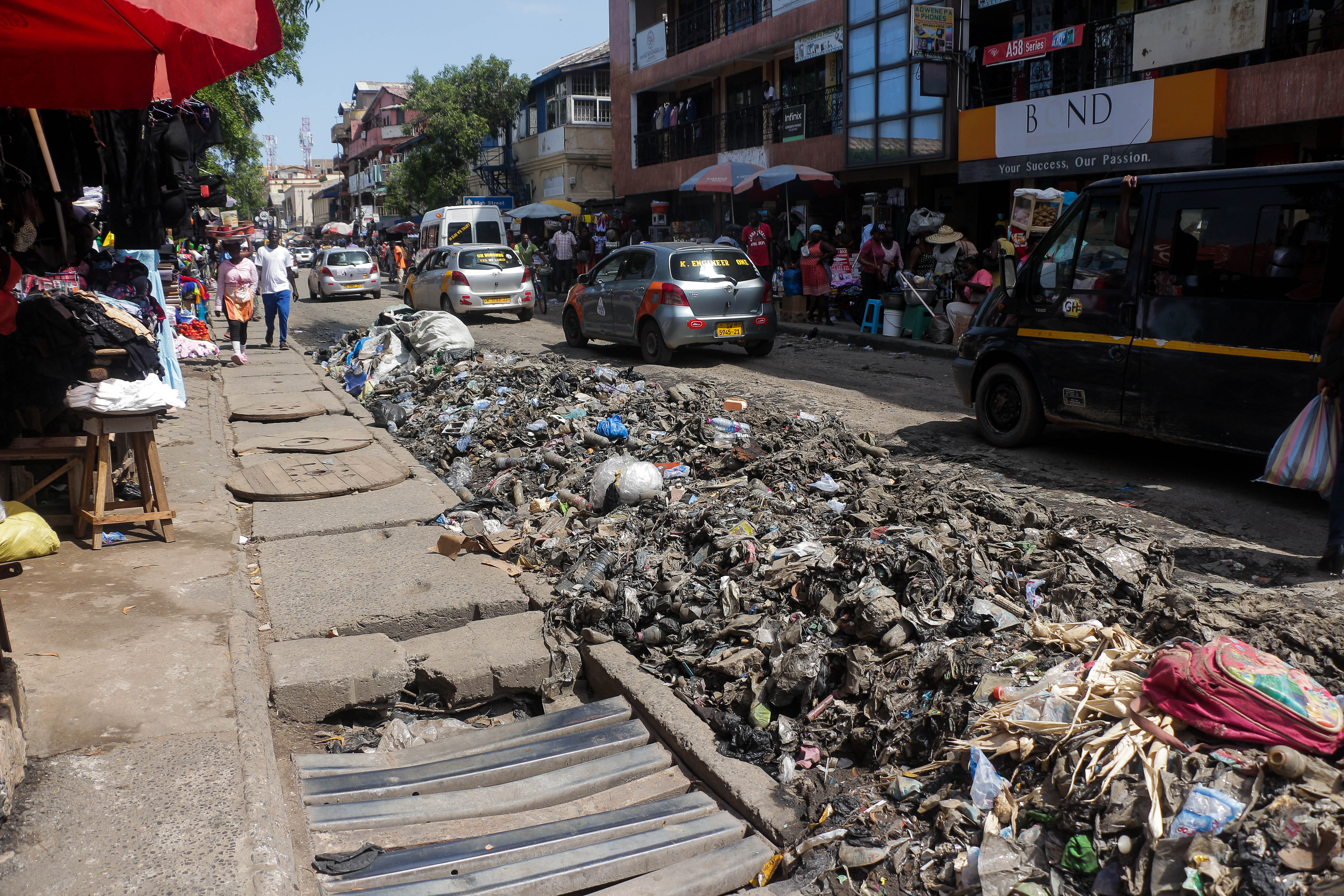
A big refuse on the side of the road in Accra Central Business District in Ghana

First Saturday of every month is earmarked National Sanitation Day across Ghana. First declared on November 1, 2014, by the Government of Ghana in response to the 2014 Ghanaian cholera outbreak, the day is a voluntary clean-up exercise for all Ghanaian residents in an effort to reduce unsanitary conditions that breed diseases and causes injuries. The National Sanitation Day (NSD) is an initiative by the Ministry of Local Government and Rural Development. A bill has recently been sent to parliament by the ministry, the bill if approved will give legal backing to the NSD program allowing it to prosecute individuals who refuse to take part in the program.

== See also ==
- Water supply and sanitation in Ghana
- Clean Up the World
