= Ba Tơ =

- Commune
- Location in Vietnam
- Coordinates: 14.763033716276771°N 108.7320962531409°E
- Country: Vietnam
- Region: South Central Coast and Central Highlands
- Province: Quảng Ngãi
- Established: 16 June 2025
- Administrative headquarters: 268 Phạm Văn Đồng Street

Area
  - Total: 120.91 km^{2} (46.68 sq mi)

Population (31 December 2024)
  - Total: 12,263
  - Density: 101/km^{2} (260/sq mi)

Ba Tơ is a commune in Quảng Ngãi province, Vietnam.

On 16 June 2025, the Standing Committee of the National Assembly of Vietnam issued Resolution No. 1677/NQ-UBTVQH15 on the arrangement of commune-level administrative units in Quảng Ngãi province in 2025. Under the resolution, the entire area and population of Ba Tơ township, Ba Cung, and Ba Bích communes, formerly part of Ba Tơ district, were merged to form a new commune named Ba Tơ.
