= National Volunteer Day =

Day for volunteerism in Ghana

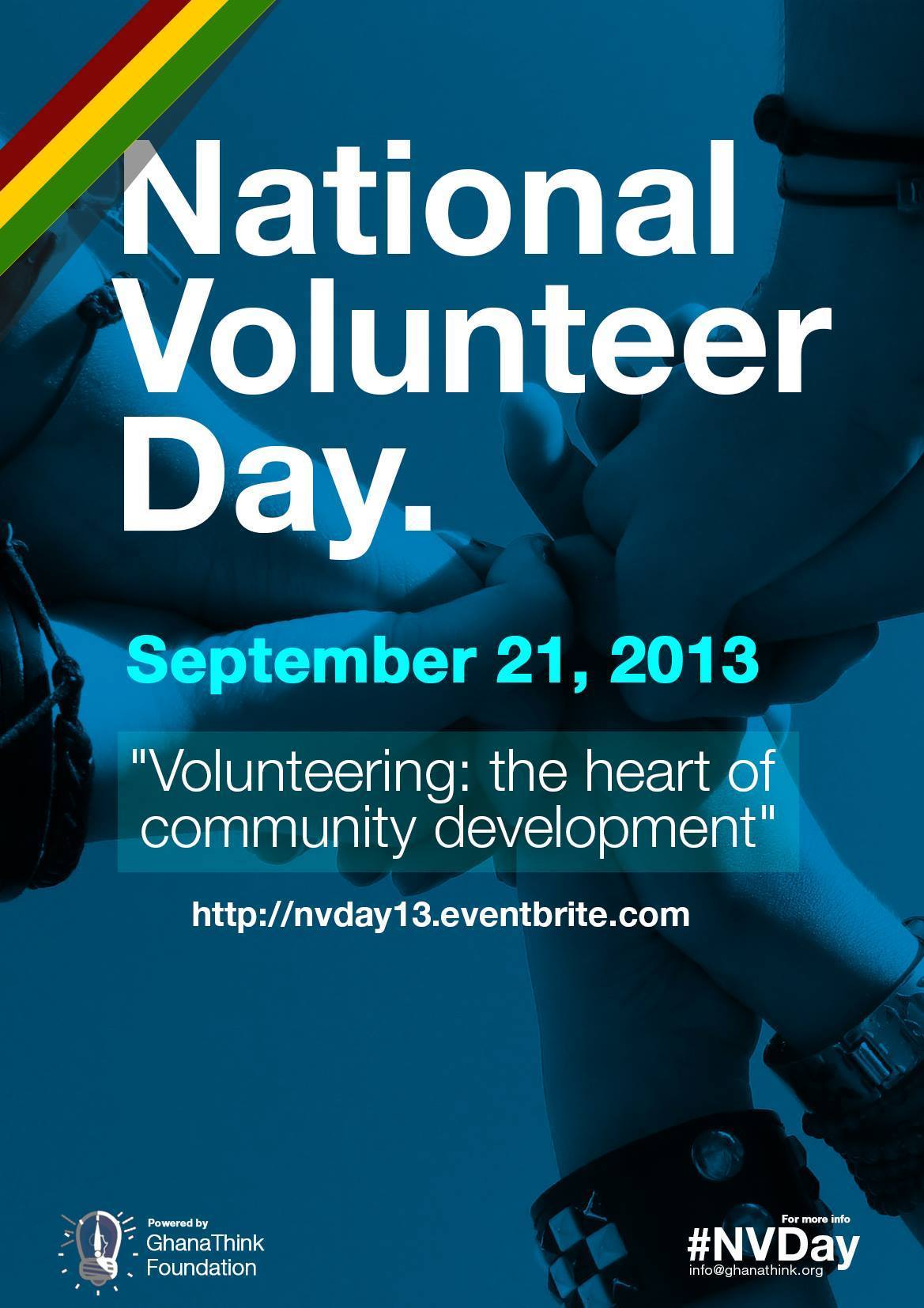
National Volunteer Day 2013 poster

National Volunteer Day (NVDay) is a day slated for the September 21 of every year which is also Founder's Day by The GhanaThink Foundation, geared towards encouraging Ghanaians to take up the attitude of Volunteerism.

The NVDay initiative is now part of the GhanaThink Foundation's Ghana Volunteer Program (GVP) which is also to promote volunteerism and volunteer activities in Ghana while getting more volunteers for this. The program was launched on International Volunteer Day, 5 December 2013.

== Aim ==
The National Volunteer Day is organised purposely to encourage more Ghanaians to volunteer for the development of their various communities and Ghana as a Nation.

== Activities and Events ==
The day is characterized by so many voluntary events and activities happening around the entire country by individuals and groups, ranging from blood donation, free IT, Greening the environment (tree planting) to free consultation by co-operate bodies.

- Tutoring in a subject
- Teaching a particular skill or talent
- Blood donation drives
- Clean-up exercises
- Orphanage visits and donation
- Improving school infrastructure
- Health screenings and talks
- Any other type of activity

== Previous National Volunteer Days ==
=== 2013 ===
In the run up to National Volunteer Day 2013, 56 activities were registered which were both online and offline engagement and publicity for these activities. On September 21, 2013, there were about 40 activities with about 300 volunteers in total participating in Ghana. Their volunteer activities directly benefited a lot of people. These activities happened in Accra, Tema, Nsawam, Kasoa, Cape Coast, Takoradi, Koforidua, Saltpond, and Tamale.

National Volunteer Day in 2013

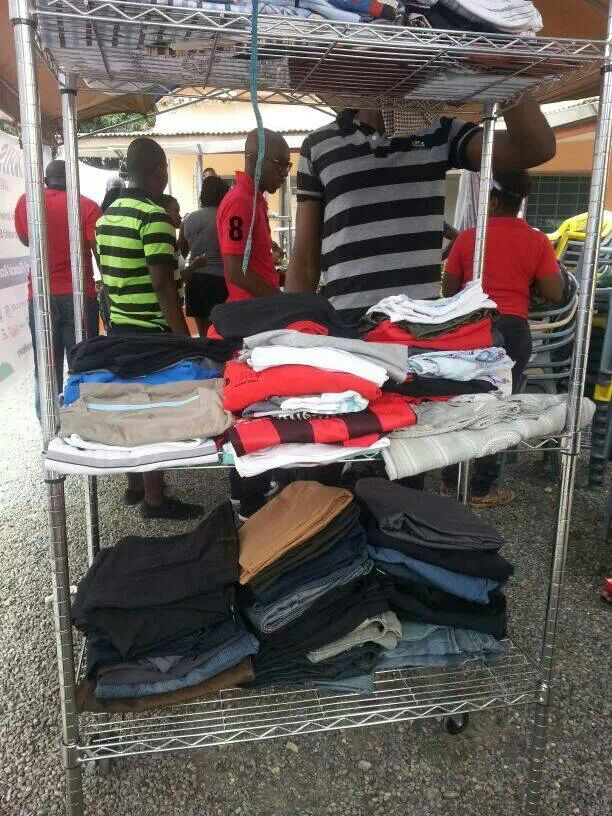
Fabric of life event at the Accra Psychiatric Hospital organised by Rotaract Club of Accra

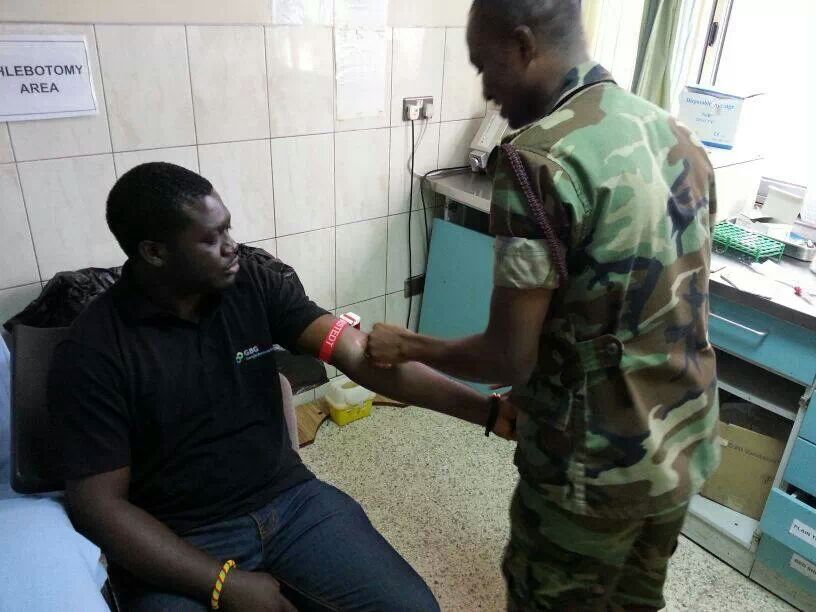
Blood donation at 37 Military Hospital, Accra

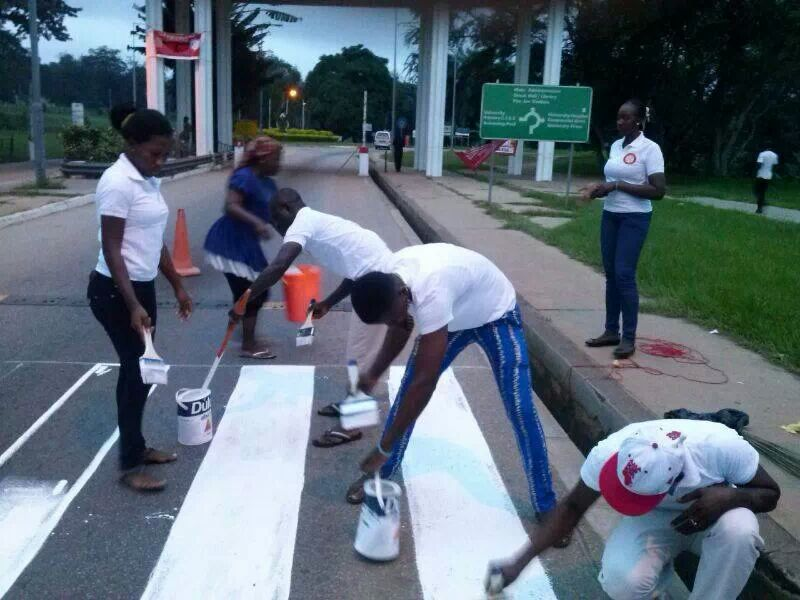
KNUST students repainting the zebra crossings in their school, Kumasi

=== 2014 ===
In 2014 several activities happened in 9 out of 10 regions in Ghana. About 80 activities with about 1000 volunteers were involved in all the activities that ensued. Some Ghanaians also volunteered in the UK as part of NVDay 14. Clean up and painting exercises became more popular alongside the various kinds of activities. The volunteer weekend period was enjoyable and the impact was even bigger than the previous year.

== See also ==
- National Sanitation Day (Ghana)
