= Ba Tơ district =

Coordinates: 14.750°N 108.667°E

Ba Tơ district Huyện Ba Tơ
- Rural District
- Interactive map of Ba Tơ district
- Country: Vietnam
- Region: South Central Coast
- Province: Quảng Ngãi
- Central hall: Ba Tơ township

Area
  - Total: 1.133 km^{2} (0.437 sq mi)

Population (2003)
  - Total: 47,268
- Time zone: UTC+7 (Indochina Time)

Ba Tơ is a former rural district of Quảng Ngãi province in the South Central Coast region of Vietnam.

== Geography ==
As of 2003 the district had a population of 47,268. The district covers an area of 1,133 km^{2}. The district capital lies at Ba Tơ.

In April 2012, there have been multiple reports of an outbreak of an unknown fatal disease in the area around Ba Tơ. See Quảng Ngãi skin disease outbreak for more details.

== Climate ==
Climate data for Ba Tơ
Month	Jan	Feb	Mar	Apr	May	Jun	Jul	Aug	Sep	Oct	Nov	Dec	Year
Record high °C (°F)	34.2 (93.6)	36.5 (97.7)	38.9 (102.0)	41.8 (107.2)	41.5 (106.7)	39.5 (103.1)	39.9 (103.8)	41.2 (106.2)	37.7 (99.9)	34.8 (94.6)	33.8 (92.8)	32.8 (91.0)	41.8 (107.2)
Mean daily maximum °C (°F)	25.5 (77.9)	27.8 (82.0)	30.6 (87.1)	33.6 (92.5)	34.7 (94.5)	34.7 (94.5)	34.4 (93.9)	34.3 (93.7)	32.3 (90.1)	29.6 (85.3)	27.4 (81.3)	25.0 (77.0)	30.8 (87.4)
Daily mean °C (°F)	21.5 (70.7)	22.7 (72.9)	24.6 (76.3)	26.9 (80.4)	27.9 (82.2)	28.3 (82.9)	28.1 (82.6)	27.9 (82.2)	26.7 (80.1)	25.3 (77.5)	23.8 (74.8)	21.8 (71.2)	25.5 (77.9)
Mean daily minimum °C (°F)	19.2 (66.6)	19.7 (67.5)	21.0 (69.8)	22.9 (73.2)	24.0 (75.2)	24.5 (76.1)	24.2 (75.6)	24.2 (75.6)	23.6 (74.5)	22.9 (73.2)	21.8 (71.2)	19.9 (67.8)	22.3 (72.1)
Record low °C (°F)	11.3 (52.3)	13.6 (56.5)	13.2 (55.8)	18.3 (64.9)	20.2 (68.4)	21.0 (69.8)	18.9 (66.0)	20.9 (69.6)	20.0 (68.0)	16.1 (61.0)	13.7 (56.7)	11.7 (53.1)	11.3 (52.3)
Average precipitation mm (inches)	156.1 (6.15)	72.3 (2.85)	81.5 (3.21)	81.1 (3.19)	187.0 (7.36)	163.8 (6.45)	133.5 (5.26)	177.9 (7.00)	335.7 (13.22)	780.7 (30.74)	985.2 (38.79)	559.3 (22.02)	3,721.5 (146.52)
Average rainy days	17.4	10.4	8.2	9.0	15.4	14.0	13.8	15.2	19.2	21.7	22.9	22.7	189.3
Average relative humidity (%)	88.6	86.6	84.9	82.9	82.5	80.6	80.5	80.5	85.7	88.5	89.9	90.2	85.1
Mean monthly sunshine hours	107.4	145.5	190.0	209.7	224.0	217.7	215.1	201.6	166.2	129.5	98.2	68.1	1,959
Source: Vietnam Institute for Building Science and Technology
