= Belina =

Village and municipality in Slovakia

Belina Béna
- Municipality
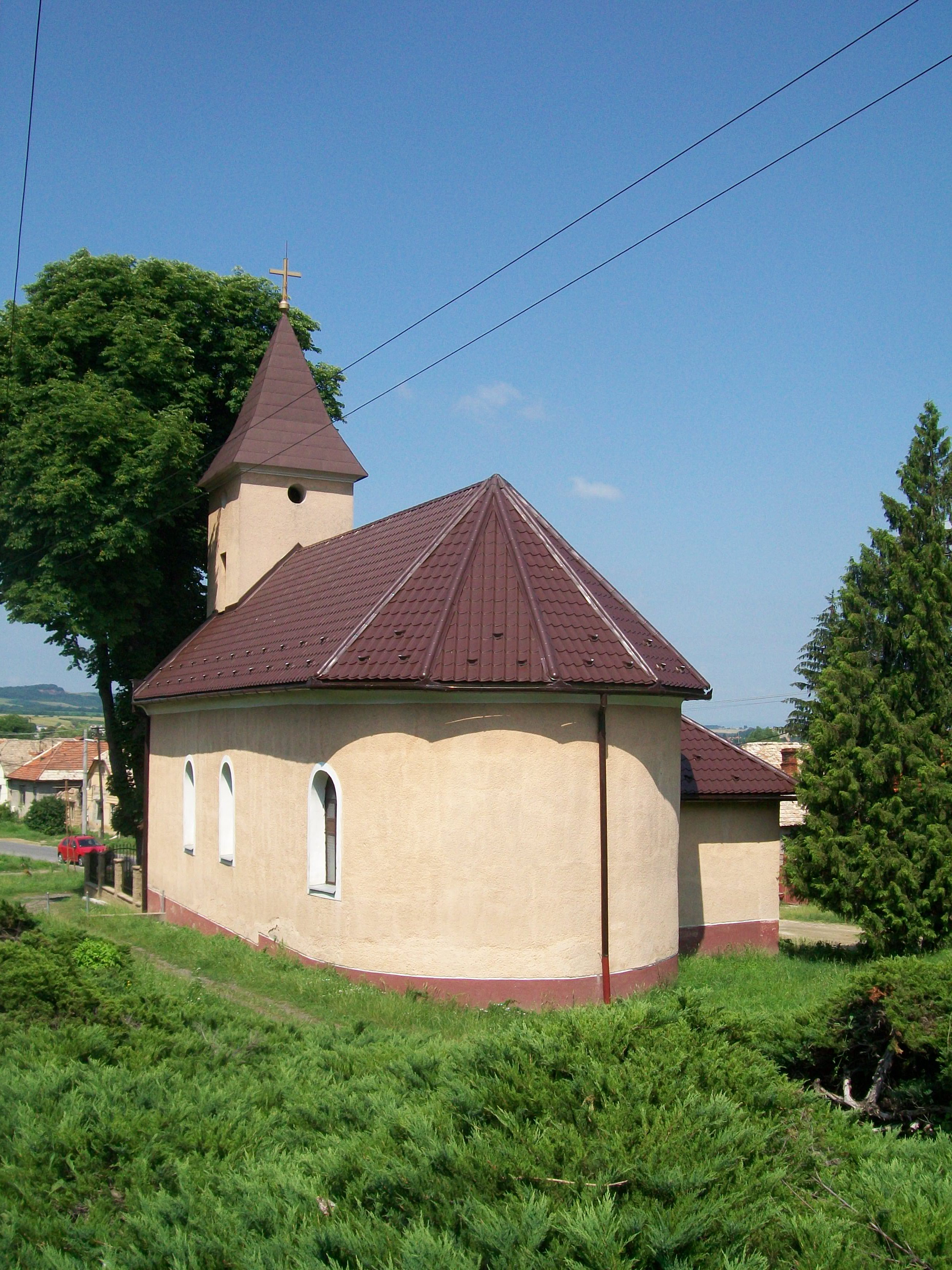

- Flag

- Location of Belina in the Banská Bystrica Region Location of Belina in Slovakia
- Coordinates: 48.25°N 19.85°E
- Country: Slovakia
- Region: Banská Bystrica Region
- District: Lučenec District
- First mentioned: 1240

Area
  - Total: 6.48 km^{2} (2.50 sq mi)
- Elevation: 206 m (676 ft)

Population (2025)
  - Total: 633
- Time zone: UTC+1 (CET)
  - Summer (DST): UTC+2 (CEST)
- Postal code: 986 01
- Area code: +421 47
- Vehicle registration plate (until 2022): LC
- Website: www.belina.sk

Belina (before 1948 Beňa, Biena; Hungarian: Béna) is a village and municipality in the Lučenec District in the Banská Bystrica Region of Slovakia.

== Geography ==
The municipality lies at an altitude of 206 metres (676 ft) and covers an area of 6.48 km^{2} (2.50 sq mi) (2025).

== History ==
In historical records, the village was first mentioned in 1371 (Bezin). The territory of the village however was first mentioned as terra Baldun in 1240. In 1371, it belonged to the knight Ratold, in the 15th century to the noble family Derencsény and in the late 16th century to the Lorántfy family.

== Population ==
Population statistic (10 years)
Year	1995	2005	2015	2025
Count	589	627	626	633
Difference		+6.45%	−0.15%	+1.11%

Population statistic
Year	2024	2025
Count	619	633
Difference		+2.26%

It has a population of 633 people (31 December 2025).

=== Ethnicity ===
Census 2021 (1+ %)
Ethnicity	Number	Fraction
Hungarian	530	85.89%
Slovak	93	15.07%
Romani	83	13.45%
Not found out	27	4.37%
Total	617	

In year 2021 was 617 people by ethnicity 530 as Hungarian, 93 as Slovak, 83 as Romani, 27 as Not found out and 2 as Czech.

Note on population: The difference values of population numbers in the table "Population statistic" and in the sections "Ethnicity" & "Religion" is caused by the use of various statistical methods.

=== Religion ===
Census 2021 (1+ %)
Religion	Number	Fraction
Roman Catholic Church	520	84.28%
Not found out	41	6.65%
None	28	4.54%
Christian Congregations in Slovakia	13	2.11%
Total	617	

In year 2021 was 617 people by religion 520 from Roman Catholic Church, 41 from Not found out, 28 from None, 13 from Christian Congregations in Slovakia, 6 from Calvinist Church, 5 from Evangelical Church, 2 from Jehovah's Witnesses, 1 from Other and not ascertained christian church and 1 from Greek Catholic Church.

== Genealogical resources ==
The records for genealogical research are available at the state archive "Statny Archiv in Banska Bystrica, Slovakia"

- Roman Catholic church records (births/marriages/deaths): 1785-1897 (parish B)

== See also ==
- List of municipalities and towns in Slovakia
