= 2015 dengue outbreak in Taiwan =

Disease outbreak in Taiwan

- 2015 dengue outbreak in Taiwan (Taiwan) Death toll
- Date: 2015/5/16 - 2016/2/14
- Location: Tainan City, Kaohsiung City, Pingtung County
- Deaths: 218
- Injuries: 43,637

In the 2015 dengue outbreak in Taiwan, a significant rise in the number of dengue fever cases was reported in Tainan City, Kaohsiung City, and Pingtung City. As of the end of 2015, official data showed that more than 40,000 people, mostly in these three cities, were infected in 2015. This epidemic began in the summer of 2015, with the first reported occurrence in the North District, Tainan. There were several documented cases in other cities and counties but none resulted in death or were of such large scale.

== Statistics ==
The Centers for Disease Control lists several statistics about the outbreak. These statistics are reportedly from the Central Epidemic Command Center (CECC) for the Dengue Outbreak. The number of infections in Taiwan during 2015 was some three times the number in 2014.

=== Cases and deaths by city ===
Statistic	Tainan City	Kaohsiung City	Pingtung City	Other areas	Total
Cases	22,741	18,933	373	525	42,572
Deaths	112	95	2	0	209

=== Deceased ===
The CDC of Taiwan's most recent press release, dated 23 December 2015, gives demographics and statistics about the deceased:

"Among the 209 deaths found to be associated with dengue infection, 106 are men and 98 are women. The median age is 75 years old. Each of them, on average, had three chronic conditions such as high blood pressure, diabetes, coronary artery diseases and renal failures. The average number of days between onset and death is 6.2."

=== Care and Recovery ===
The same press release as above states:

"Currently, 44 dengue patients are being treated in the intensive care unit. 98.1% of the total reported cases have recovered."
