= 2017 Uganda Marburg virus outbreak =

Disease outbreak in Uganda

Uganda Marburg outbreak 2017
- Initial case= 25 September 2017; Declared ended= 2 December 2017
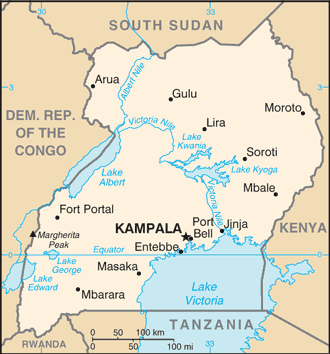
- Uganda

- Uganda (orthographic projection)
- Confirmed cases: 2
- Probable cases: 1
- Deaths: 3

The 2017 Uganda Marburg virus outbreak was confirmed by the World Health Organization (WHO) on 20 October 2017 after there had been an initial fatality due to the virus.

The Ugandan Ministry of Health indicated that an individual had died of the virus on 19 October; the following day, 20 October, WHO released a press statement regarding the matter. The eastern part of the country is the affected area where the cases have occurred. On 22 October, it was reported that 55 individuals were under surveillance for the virus. On 25 October, the number of individuals rose to 155 in terms of contact tracing

== Virology and epidemiology ==
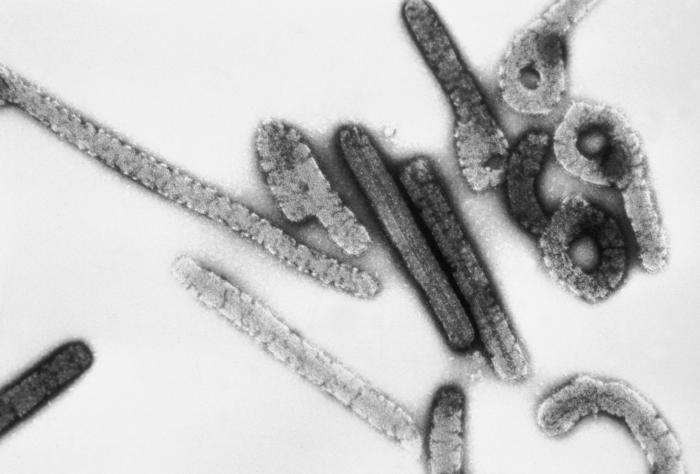
Marburg virus

According to the Centers for Disease Control and Prevention (CDC), the Marburg virus was first recognised in 1967. In terms of diagnosis the presentation is similar to malaria or typhoid fever and therefore not easy to identify (diagnose).

The Marburg virus is considered a filovirus, which is the same as the Ebola virus in terms of viral classification. According to Mehedi, et al. macrophages, monocytes, and dendritic cells, are what the virus attacks due to their importance in the human bodies normal mechanism

According to the World Health Organization there is currently no treatment for the disease. As of 11 November 2017, according to the Ministry of Health no new cases have been reported to this point the report originates from Kampala.

On 8 December the World Health Organization declared the end to the outbreak in the country of Uganda due to two 21-day quarantine periods

=== Other outbreaks ===
The table lists a subset of the Marburg virus disease outbreaks, which have occurred specifically in Uganda:

Marburg virus disease outbreaks in Uganda
Year	Country	Virus	Human cases	Human deaths	Case fatality rate	Reference
2007	Uganda	MARV & RAVV	2	1	50%	
2008	Uganda Netherlands United States	MARV	2	1	50%	
2012	Uganda	MARV	18	9	50%	
2014	Uganda	MARV	1	1	100%	
2017	Uganda	MARV	3	3	100%	

== See also ==
- Marburg virus disease
- Marburg virus
- Filoviridae
