= 2012 Sierra Leonean cholera outbreak =

Cholera outbreak in Sierra Leone

- Date: February 2012-present
- Location: Sierra Leone and Guinea
- Deaths: 392
- Injuries: Reported cases: 25,000+

As of 24 September 2012, a cholera outbreak in Sierra Leone had caused the deaths of 392 people. It was the country's largest outbreak of cholera since first reported in 1970 and the deadliest since the 1994–1995 cholera outbreak. The outbreak has also affected Guinea, which shares a reservoir near the coast. This was the largest cholera outbreak in Africa in 2012.

Abdulai Bayraytay, the spokesman of the Sierra Leonean government, stated that as of 1 October 2012 there were no new reported cases of cholera. A second outbreak occurred in 2013 with 368 cases reported by August.

== Sources ==
Cholera is a water-borne disease, primarily spread by the consumption of water or food contaminated by the feces of an infected person. The outbreak was triggered by heavy rainfall and flooding in Sierra Leone and Guinea, combined with poor hygiene practices, unsafe water sources, and ineffective waste management. Crowded living conditions, poor sanitation and inadequate access to safe water are responsible for the higher rates of the outbreak in the Western Area including Freetown, the capital of Sierra Leone.

Only about 40% of people in Sierra Leone have access to a private or shared latrine, where approximately seven families typically share one toilet. According to The Africa Review, nearly 60% of toilets are pit toilets that easily drain directly into sources of drinking water and more than 30% of people defecate in the open. The water and sanitation systems were damaged after the civil war in Sierra Leone, and have not been rebuilt properly, leaving approximately 43% of Sierra Leoneans without access to clean water. Poor health-care system in the country with the population of six million people also contributes to the outbreak. The UN figures indicate that there is only one doctor per 34,744 people.

== Casualties ==
The disease has killed 392 people and infected more than 25,000 others in Sierra Leone and Guinea since February 2012, when the epidemic was reported. On 4 September 2012, the death toll increased to 350. On 12 September, Dr. Amara Jambai, the Director of Disease Surveillance and Control in the Ministry of Health and Sanitation, reported that cholera infection in Sierra Leone dropped as a result of the activities of the government and other organizations.

For the period of January to mid-August 2012, more than 11,600 cholera cases were officially recorded by the Ministry of Health and Sanitation in Sierra Leone. By 30 August, reported cases increased to 13,934 according to the World Health Organization (WHO). The UN Office for the Coordination of Humanitarian Affairs (OCHA) reported that ten of Sierra Leone's thirteen districts were affected. The outbreak occurred primarily in eight districts until August 2012: Port Loko, Kambia, Tonkolili, Bo, Moyamba, Bombali, Pujehun and the Western Area. However, twelve districts became affected by the outbreak by September 2012.

Of these districts, the one most affected is the Western Area, which includes the capital, Freetown. This area witnessed 4,965 cases and 63 deaths from 1 January to mid-August 2012. The number of cases and deaths for Port Loko during the same period is 2,806 and 45, respectively. There were 1,134 reported cases and 28 deaths in the Kambala district. In Moyamba district nearly 20 people died from the cholera outbreak from 25 July to November 2012. At the beginning of August, the disease began to ravage the Kenema district. The Ministry of Health and Sanitation reported that the disease is spreading more rapidly in cities than in isolated areas with poor sanitation.

On 24 September, OCHA issued a report, indicating that in the period between late August and 16 September, new cholera cases per week decreased from 2,110 to 1,418 in Sierra Leone and from 1,152 to 346 in Guinea. According to the data of the UN Children's Fund (UNICEF) and the World Health Organization, nearly 841 new cases were reported in at the beginning of October 2012. It was 433 in the second week of October.

== State of emergency ==
On 17 August 2012, Sierra Leonean President Ernest Bai Koroma announced that the outbreak was a national public health crisis. At this time the cholera outbreak had a mortality rate of 1.8% in the country, nearly double the threshold for a state of emergency. By the end of August 2012, approximately 13,300 people were infected by cholera; humanitarian officials confirmed that 217 had already died by 23 August. The Sierra Leonean government and WHO predict that 32,000 people will be infected in September due to the rainy season.

== International responses ==
In late August 2012, Amanda McClelland, the Emergency Health Coordinator of the International Federation of Red Cross and Red Crescent Societies, said that the outbreak "has the potential to cause a serious humanitarian crisis" and called for "more funds to deliver the most effective response".

The British government announced that it allocated million for an emergency plan to counter the cholera outbreak in Sierra Leone. Additionally, the Rapid Response Facility (RRF) established in March 2012 and activated by the British government is expected to assist Sierra Leone in coping with the epidemic. The facility is a network consisting of private businesses and specialist aid organisations that provide rapid emergency medical, water and sanitation assistance to affected people in the country.

In addition, Doctors Without Borders, in cooperation with the Ministry of Health and Sanitation, runs three cholera treatment units in Freetown, where more than 500 patients have been treated. The organisation has treated approximately 4,600 patients in Sierra Leone and Guinea since February. The group has begun to establish other cholera treatment centres at 34 Military Hospital in the west of Freetown, expanding the total number of beds from 90 to 200. The group is also collaborating with the Ministry of Health and Sanitation to inform the public of how to avoid contracting the disease. Among the other groups helping victims are Action Firm (AF) and the Sierra Leone Red Cross Society. AF provided free medical care for victims while about 400 volunteers of the Sierra Leone Red Cross helped out on sanitation awareness campaigns. Oxfam, a charity group based in the United Kingdom, is another group that provides nearly 67,000 people in Freetown with emergency water chlorination. Oxfam also plans to assist up to 500,000 people with cholera prevention kits, water purification kits and public information campaigns on how to prevent the disease. The Isle of Man donated to assist the activities in the country through Oxfam. The other British groups mobilised include Save the Children, International Rescue Committee, Concern, Care International and the British Red Cross. The Finnish Red Cross sent medication and doctors to the country on 24 and 25 August. World Vision is also working with the government to prevent the disease from spreading through various activities, including the collection of the garbage pills. An International Centre for Diarrhoeal Disease Research, Bangladesh team began its activities in coordination with the WHO in the country on 6 September 2012.

The International Federation of Red Cross and Red Crescent Societies launched an emergency appeal for million in August, explaining that the number of cases of cholera was rising, along with the number of fatal cases. Tiina Saarikoski of the International Federation of Red Cross and Red Crescent Society reported on 30 August that the Bombali, Tonkolili, Port Loko and Kambia districts have been targeted to effectively deal with the epidemic. The IFRC has funded health promotion activities and assistance to affected families, including the preparation of oral rehydration solutions and construction of suitable toilets, but the organisation has stated that the level of aid coverage remains "very low."

Oral cholera vaccines have the potential to shorten cholera outbreaks, and hence reduce the morbidity and mortality associated with outbreaks have not been deployed in Sierra Leone. The large international institutions IFRC as well WHO have shied away from large mass vaccination campaigns despite the fact that oral cholera vaccines have been successfully used earlier in 2012 by MSF in Guinea Bissau and by Partners in Health in Haiti.

== See also ==
- 2014 Ebola virus epidemic in Sierra Leone
