= 2017 dengue outbreak in Sri Lanka =

Disease outbreak in Sri Lanka

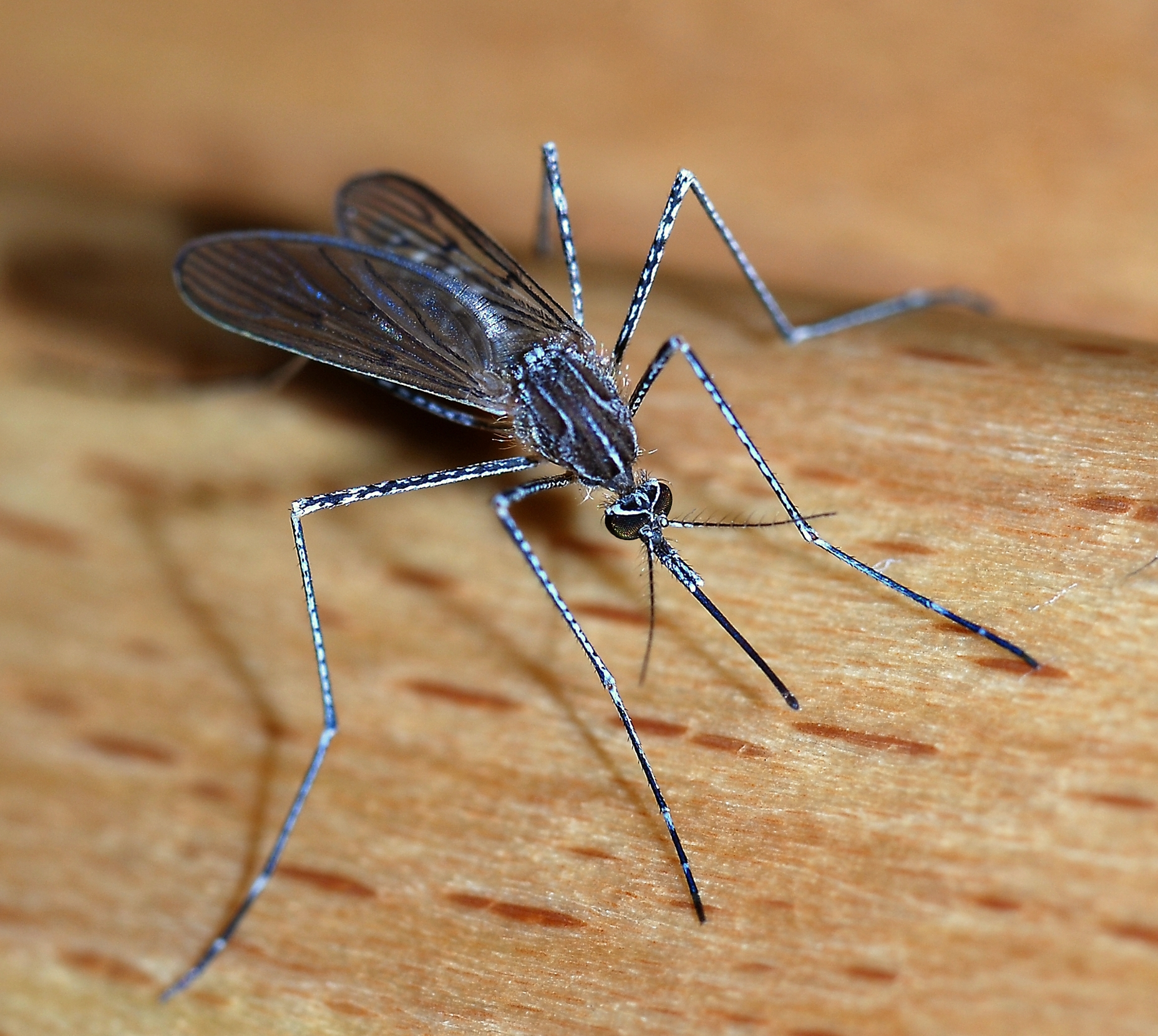
- Disease: Dengue fever
- Pathogen: Dengue virus
- Dates: May 2017 – Aug 2017
- Type: DENV-2
- Confirmed cases: 186,101
- Deaths: 440
- Fatality rate: 0.24%
- Vaccinations: no vaccine available (at time)

In 2017, there was a rise in the number of dengue fever cases reported in the island country of Sri Lanka. The peak of the outbreak occurred during the mid-year monsoon season with more than 40,000 cases reported in July alone, far exceeding historical highs. By the end of the year, the total number of dengue cases had risen to 186,101.

Forty-three percent of cases were recorded in urban areas of the Western Province, such as the Colombo district. The majority of dengue cases affected young people and school children. By the end of the year, the total number of dengue-related deaths reached 440.

== Background ==
In 2017, Sri Lanka experienced its largest outbreak of dengue fever, a neglected tropical disease, since the first recorded case in 1962. This biological hazard, transmitted via female mosquito bites, resulted in 186,101 dengue cases, a significant increase compared to previous years (see table below), and led to 440 deaths.

Annual Dengue Cases, 2010–2022
Year	Number of cases
2010	34,188
2011	28,473
2012	44,461
2013	32,063
2014	47,502
2015	29,777
2016	50,592
2017	186,101
2018	51,659
2019	105,049
2020	31,162
2021	25,067
2022	57,864

== Outbreak ==
Sri Lanka's Ministry of Health (MoH) reported an increase in dengue fever cases from January 2017 and a peak in July of the same year. The majority of cases were concentrated in the Western and Northern parts of the country, particularly in the urban Colombo district.

Reported Dengue Cases (2017)
Area	Jan	Feb	Mar	Apr	May	Jun	Jul	Aug	Sep	Oct	Nov	Dec	Total
Sri Lanka	10,927	8,724	13,540	12,540	15,963	25,319	41,121	22,270	9,519	6,614	8,868	10,753	186,158
Colombo District	2,734	1,900	2,467	2,570	3,333	5,372	7,471	3,620	1,251	823	1,131	1,602	34,274
Gampaha District	1,635	1,087	1,870	2,072	3,168	4,901	9,039	3,553	1,246	779	1,078	1,219	31,647
Kalutara District	581	448	836	739	946	1,248	2,612	1,477	663	337	528	546	10,961

The Government of Sri Lanka spent over $12 million (USD) on outbreak control efforts, with support from non-governmental organizations (NGOs) like the Red Cross.

== Causes ==
=== Climate ===
Sri Lanka's tropical climate offers prime mosquito breeding conditions. The 2017 monsoon rains (May–August) coincided with the peak of the dengue outbreak. These triggered floods and disrupted refuse collection, increasing mosquito breeding sites. However, annual rainfall and El Nino conditions were lower on average than previous years, suggesting that the climate was not completely responsible for the outbreak.

=== Political ===
The MoH failed to prepare and take appropriate mosquito vector control actions. Insufficiencies in the virologic surveillance program failed to identify dengue serotypes and genotypes. This left Sri Lanka unprepared for new strains (DENV-2), for which their population would have little immunity.

=== Socio-economic ===
Sri Lanka is a middle-income country with a gross domestic product (GDP) per capita of US$12,600 (2017). This restricts investment in healthcare infrastructure, resulting in an overstretched healthcare system. High urban population density in Western districts created a higher probability of transmission. In 2017, 42% of Sri Lankans were in extreme poverty (below US$5.50 a day), which limits a family's access to healthcare and increases the risk of disease. The Sri Lankan civil war (1983–2009) displaced people to internally displaced persons (IDP) camps and marginalized ethnic groups (e.g. Tamils) in North and Eastern districts, reducing support and increasing disease risk.

== Impacts ==
=== Short-term impacts ===
The fever brought an unexpectedly high death toll. Along with the death toll, it also caused disruption to workplaces, household income, and education as the majority of cases were people aged 10–29. Direct and indirect impacts of the dengue outbreak affected 600,000 people in all 25 districts, prominently in urban areas. Some districts, however, may have been under-reported due to ethnic marginalization and the presence of IDP camps. Dengue treatment put pressure on national economic resources, costing Sri Lanka LKR 1.938 billion (US$12.7 million).

=== Long-term impacts ===
Today, dengue cases are declining in Sri Lanka, with 25,067 total cases in 2021. Dengue is still present with new strains (serotypes DENV-3 and DENV-4) becoming more prominent and threatening future outbreaks. In 2022, an economic crisis began in Sri Lanka along with severe food insecurity; the dengue outbreak would be a contributing factor.

== Future ==
Climate change models suggest that Sri Lanka's climate is becoming more conducive to mosquito breeding and this combined with economic instability could trigger a future epidemic. There is a possibility that a cycle of disease, poverty, and food insecurity may be challenging to break. However, this could be mitigated if the MoH, supported by institutions like the World Health Organization (WHO), engage in proactive strategies. A licensed vaccine (Dengvaxia; made by Sanofi Pasteur) is now available, at the cost of US$78 per person—with five more in development. However, Sri Lanka's expenditure is US$161 per capita on healthcare as of 2021. The vaccine is a significant proportion of that budget and in uncertain economic times, may not be a priority.

== See also ==
- Dengue fever outbreaks
- Neglected Tropical Diseases
- Tropical disease
- Mosquito-borne disease
