= Quảng Ngãi skin disease outbreak =

2012 disease outbreak in Vietnam

As of April 2012, multiple press sources reported an outbreak of an unidentified skin disease in the Ba Tơ District of Quảng Ngãi Province, Vietnam. The disease is reported to begin as a skin rash, and in numerous cases appears to have led to the death of the affected individual through organ failure. As of 21 April 2012, the disease was reported to have affected 170 people, and killed 19.

In 2012, The Associated Press reported that Vietnam had asked for assistance from the World Health Organization in tackling the disease.

Another, separate unknown skin disease was reported from Quảng Ngãi's Sơn Hà District in early May 2012.

Poisonous heavy metals in the soil or toxic mould on rice have been considered the most likely causes so far.

Another outbreak of the same disease in the Quảng Ngãi area was reported in March 2013.
