= 2017 Democratic Republic of the Congo Ebola outbreak =

Disease outbreak in the Democratic Republic of the Congo

Democratic Republic of the Congo Ebola outbreak 2017
- Initial case: 22 April 2017; Ended: 1 July 2017
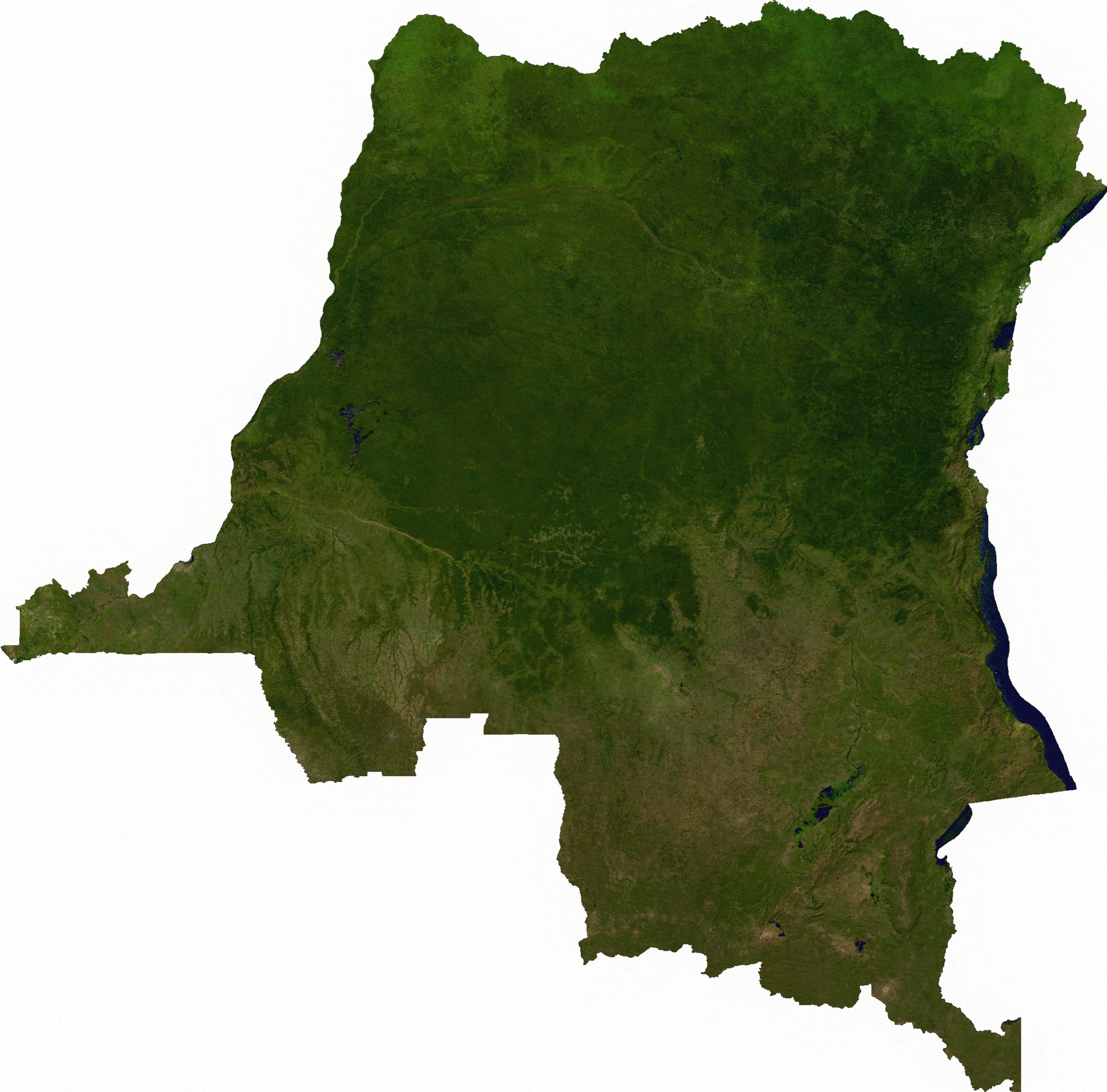
- Democratic Republic of the Congo
- Confirmed cases: 5
- Probable cases: 3
- Deaths: 4

On 11 May 2017, the Democratic Republic of the Congo (DRC) was identified by the World Health Organization (WHO) as having one Ebola-related death.

As of 8 June 2017, there were five confirmed cases and three probable cases. Of these, four survived and four died. The affected areas of the DRC are Mabongo (one confirmed), Ngayi (one probable), and Nambwa (four confirmed and two probable) in Likati health zone. According to the WHO, "Modelling suggests the risk of further cases is currently low but not negligible.... As of ... [8 June], 83% of simulated scenarios predict no further cases in the next 30 days."

According to the U.S. Centers for Disease Control and Prevention, "Ebola ... is a rare and deadly disease caused by infection with one of the Ebola virus species. Ebola can cause disease in humans and nonhuman primates (monkeys, gorillas, and chimpanzees)." Ebola was first identified in 1976 near the Ebola River in the DRC. More than 11,300 people died in the 2013 to 2016 Ebola outbreak in West Africa.According to the WHO's "Global Health Observatory", the DRC's population in 2015 was 77,267,000. On 1 July 2017, DRC Minister of Public Health, Dr Oly Ilunga Kalenga, declared that the country had passed a 42-day period with no new recorded cases, and therefore the outbreak was over. A subsequent outbreak of Ebola was declared by WHO on 8 May 2018, in the northwest Province of Équateur.

== Epidemiology ==
The first "situation report" from the WHO on 15 May 2017 listed 19 suspected cases and 3 deaths. The first person to request treatment was a 39-year-old male.

On 16 May, the WHO indicated that there had been 21 suspected cases and 3 deaths. Approximately 400 additional individuals were being monitored in the same region of the DRC. On 17 May, WHO said that the number of individuals being monitored had risen to about 416, while the following day, the number of confirmed and suspected cases had risen to 29. As of 24 May, 520 individuals were reported to be on the contact list to monitor their health status. Of those, 226 had completed 21 days of monitoring. As of 27 May, 30 cases had been reclassified as not Ebola-related.

== Responses ==
=== Organizations ===
On 13 May 2017, Doctors Without Borders indicated that they would send a team to the most recently affected area in the DRC.

The GAVI vaccine alliance indicated that 300,000 doses of the experimental Ebola vaccine were available if needed. On 28 May, it was reported that the DRC had authorized use of the vaccine.

=== Nearby countries ===
As of 8 June 2017, the WHO does not recommend any restrictions of travel and trade in relation to this outbreak. The following nine countries have instituted entry screening at airports and ports of entry: Kenya, Malawi, Nigeria, Rwanda, South Africa, Tanzania, Uganda, Zambia, and Zimbabwe. Rwanda has issued travel advisories to avoid unnecessary travel to the DRC. Kenya and Rwanda have implemented information checking on arrival for passengers with a travel history from or through the DRC. According to the WHO, countries have the right to implement these measures.

On 20 May, the news media reported Rwanda's closure of its border with the DRC for passengers coming from affected areas in the DRC. On 23 May, the WHO confirmed that Rwanda is denying entry to visitors with fever who have been to those areas. Under Article 43 of the International Health Regulations (2005), the WHO considers these actions to be "additional health measures ... that significantly interfere with international traffic". As of 8 June the WHO is attempting to obtain and review Rwanda's public health rationale and relevant scientific information for implementing these measures.

== Virology ==
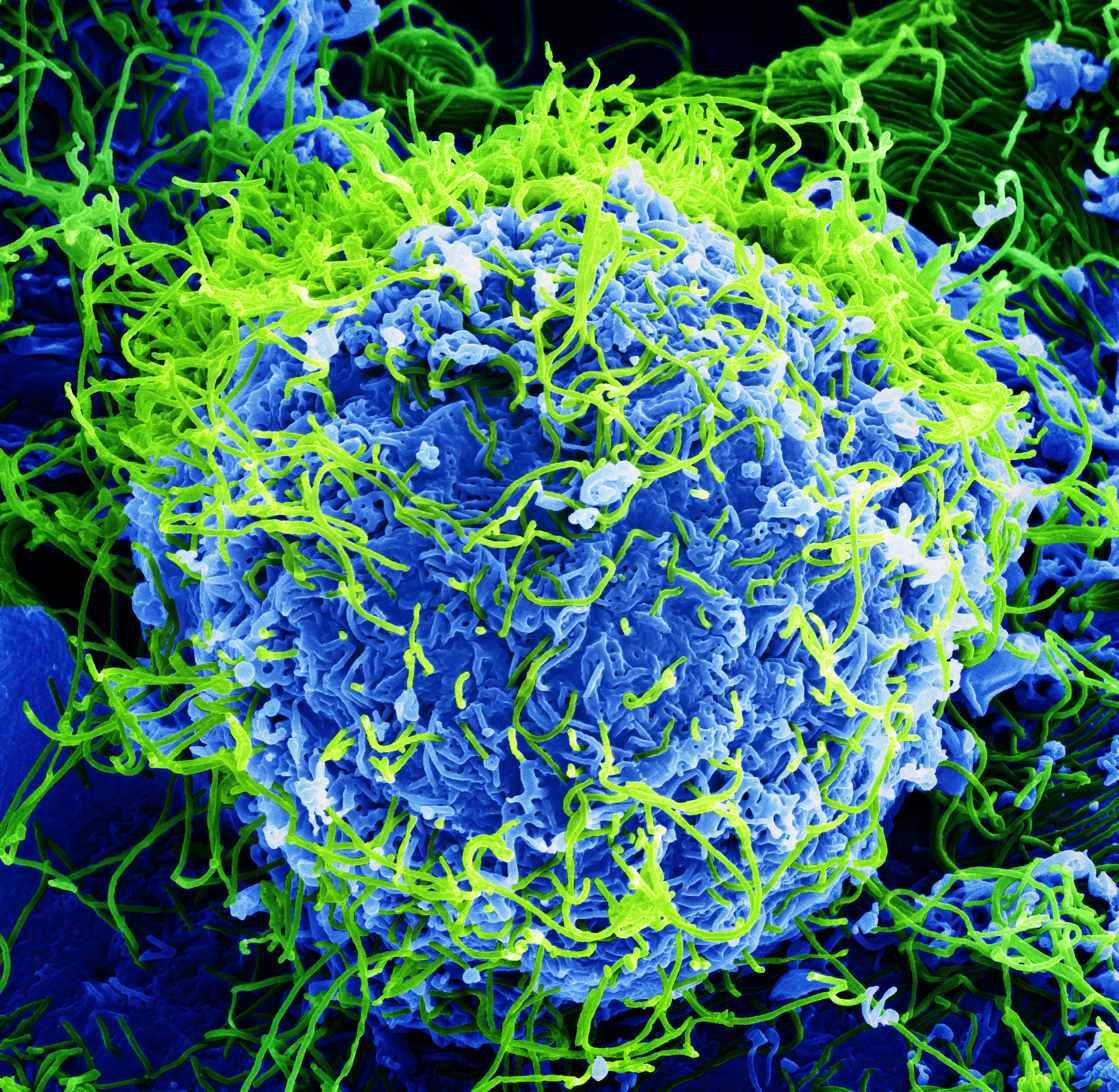
Ebola virus - electron micrograph

The sub-type Zaire ebolavirus has been confirmed in the current outbreak, from the family Filoviridae. It is a single stranded RNA virus, with a 60-90 percent mortality rate (the highest among the strains).An unusually high mortality has been reported in the local pig population. An investigation into potential causes is being considered.

=== History of outbreaks in the DRC ===
The virus took its name from the Ebola River near the village in Zaire (now the DRC) where the first documented outbreak occurred. Multiple documented outbreaks of Ebola virus disease have occurred in the DRC since 1976, with the eleven outbreaks that have occurred summarised in the table below.

Timeline of Ebola outbreaks in the Democratic Republic of the Congo (formerly Zaire) since 1976
^{V}^{・}^{T} Date	Country	Major location	Outbreak information				Source
^{V}^{・}^{T} Date	Country	Major location	Strain	Cases	Deaths	CFR	Source
Aug 1976	Zaire	Yambuku	EBOV	318	280	88%	
Jun 1977	Zaire	Tandala	EBOV	1	1	100%	
May–Jul 1995	Zaire	Kikwit	EBOV	315	254	81%	
Aug–Nov 2007	Democratic Republic of the Congo	Kasai-Occidental	EBOV	264	187	71%	
Dec 2008–Feb 2009	Democratic Republic of the Congo	Kasai-Occidental	EBOV	32	14	45%	
Jun–Nov 2012	Democratic Republic of the Congo	Orientale	BDBV	77	36	47%	
Aug–Nov 2014	Democratic Republic of the Congo	Tshuapa	EBOV	66	49	74%	
May–Jul 2017	Democratic Republic of the Congo	Likati	EBOV	8	4	50%	
Apr–Jul 2018	Democratic Republic of the Congo	Équateur Province	EBOV	54	33	61%	
Aug 2018–June 2020	Democratic Republic of the Congo	Kivu	EBOV	3,470	2,280	66%	
June–Nov 2020	Democratic Republic of the Congo	Équateur Province	EBOV	130	55	42%	
Feb 2021–May 2021	Democratic Republic of the Congo	North Kivu	EBOV	12	6	50%	
April 2022	Democratic Republic of the Congo	Équateur Province	EBOV	5	5	100%	
August 2022	Democratic Republic of the Congo	North Kivu	EBOV	1	1	100%	

== See also ==
- List of Ebola outbreaks
- 2014 Democratic Republic of the Congo Ebola virus outbreak
- 2018 Équateur province Democratic Republic of the Congo Ebola virus outbreak
- 2018 Kivu Democratic Republic of the Congo Ebola virus outbreak
