= Shimla jaundice outbreak =

2015–16 jaundice outbreak in Shimla, India

The Shimla jaundice outbreak is an outbreak of jaundice in the North Indian town of Shimla. The first reported cases of jaundice in Shimla began in December 2015. As of March 2016 the outbreak is still ongoing, and should continue without changes to Shimla's water system. According to official estimates 10 people have died and 1600 have developed the disease. Unofficial estimates put the number of infected at over 10,000, with half of the total families in Shimla having experienced infection.

The cause of the outbreak is Hepatitis E contamination in Shimla's water supply, stemming from improperly filtered sewage released into the Ashwani Khud river system. The Hepatitis E virus, commonly contracted from faecal matter, attacks the liver of infected individuals thereby causing jaundice. Contaminated water finds its way into the city's water supply schemes, located downstream from the sewage treatment plants. The problem is exasperated in winter months, when less rainfall leads to less water volume, and therefore higher concentration of the virus.

== See also ==
- Water treatment
