= 2019 Cook Islands dengue fever outbreak =

Disease outbreak in the Cook Islands

The Cook Islands Dengue Fever Outbreak refers to the Dengue fever outbreak in the Cook Islands beginning sometime in January 2019, declared an outbreak after seven cases were detected with varying stages. The Ministry of Health stated one case was allegedly from French Polynesia. This was relatively new, as the last dengue fever outbreak was in 2009; this specific serotype of DENV-1 in 2007.

Initial cases were restricted to Rarotonga and Aitutaki, but in August 2020 a case was reported on Pukapuka. The Pukapuka outbreak was brought under control in October 2020 after a mosquito eradication campaign, and the entire outbreak was declared over in early November 2020. There were a total of 380 probable or confirmed cases (6 in Aitutaki, 5 in Pukapuka, and the rest on Rarotonga), 77 hospitalisations, and no deaths.
