= 2015 United States E. coli outbreak =

Disease outbreak in the United States

- English name: Escherichia coli O157:H7
- Date: Illnesses started on dates ranging from October 6, 2015 to November 3, 2015.
- Duration: The outbreak is reported to have concluded.
- Location: California, Colorado, Missouri, Montana, Utah, Virginia, and Washington
- Type: Escherichia coli outbreak
- Cause: Contaminated celery in chicken salad at various retailers
- Deaths: 0
- Injuries: 19

The 2015 United States E. coli outbreak was an incident in the United States involving the spread of Escherichia coli O157:H7 through contaminated celery which was consumed in chicken salad at various large retailers. A product recall covering more than one dozen states and over 155,000 products has taken place as a result of the incident.

== Cases ==
Nineteen cases of E. coli were linked to the outbreak, across seven states, primarily in the western half of the United States. Of these reported cases, five resulted in hospitalization, with two patients developing hemolytic-uremic syndrome, a type of kidney failure; no deaths occurred as a result of the outbreak. This outbreak was therefore the second largest to occur in the U.S. in 2015, behind the far more severe Chipotle outbreak, which totaled about sixty cases.

== Locations affected ==
A total of 19 cases of E. coli linked to the outbreak were reported, throughout seven states: California, Colorado, Missouri, Montana, Utah, Virginia, and Washington. Recalls of Costco rotisserie chicken salad, which was deemed the source of the outbreak, occurred throughout the entire United States, with Costco claiming to have removed all infected products by November 20, 2015.

== Epidemiology ==
The epidemiologic evidence collected during the outbreak suggested that rotisserie chicken salad made and sold in Costco Wholesale stores in several states was the likely source of the outbreak.
