= 2018 Australian rockmelon listeriosis outbreak =

Food safety incident in Australia and Singapore

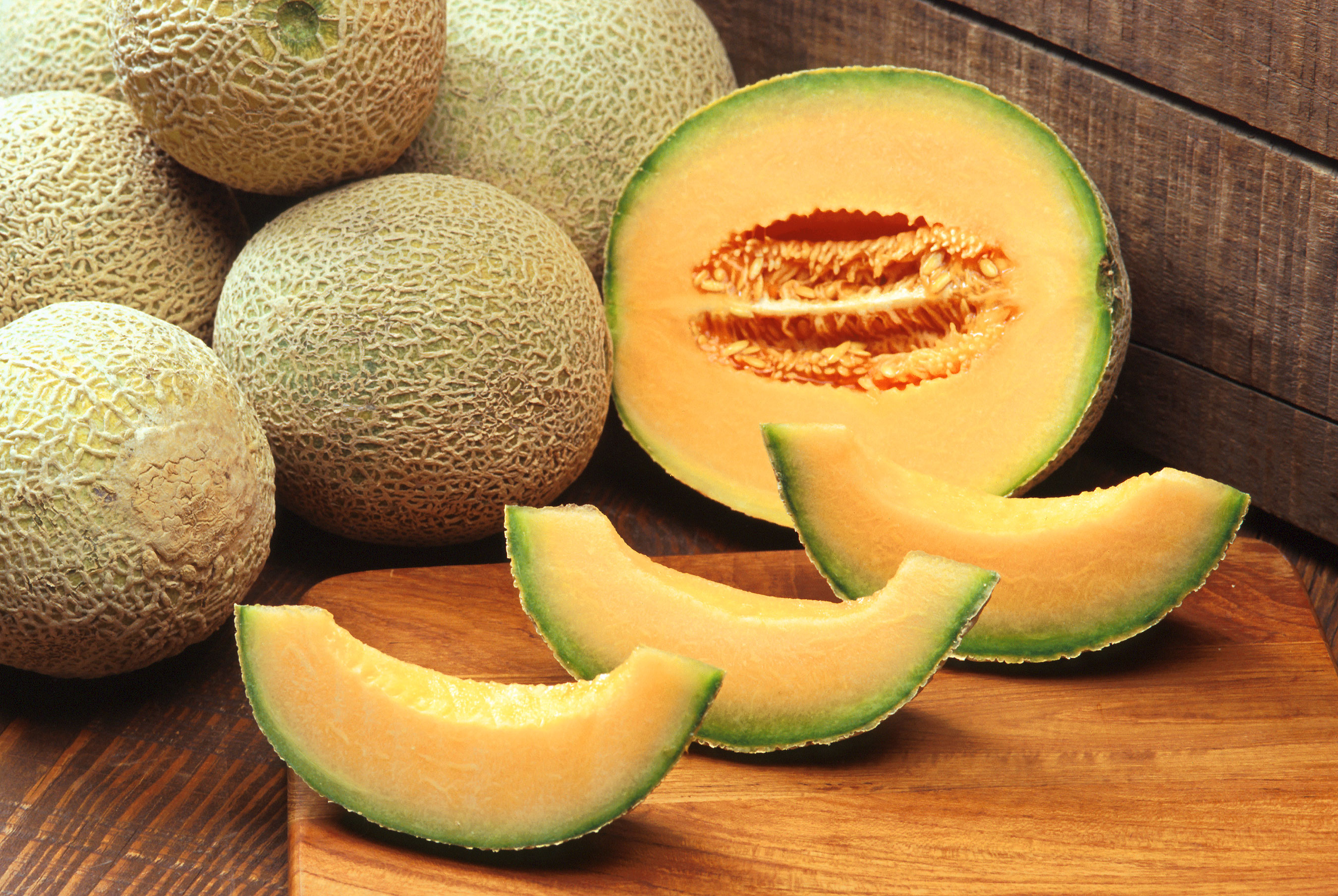
- The outbreak was traced to rockmelons grown in the Riverina region of New South Wales.
- Location: Australia, Singapore
- Date: January–March 2018
- Deaths: 6
- Injuries: 18

The 2018 Australian rockmelon listeriosis outbreak was an outbreak of Listeriosis, caused by the bacteria Listeria monocytogenes, later traced to rockmelon (also known as cantaloupe) grown by Rombola Family Farms in the Riverina region of New South Wales, Australia.

The outbreak killed seven people, caused a miscarriage, and infected a further 15 people in Australia and infected two more people in Singapore, who had consumed rockmelon imported from Australia.

== Outbreak ==
The NSW Food Authority began investigating a link between an outbreak of Listeriosis and the consumption of rockmelon in January 2018. NSW Health first issued a public warning on 28 February. This prompted the Australian Melon Association to warn consumers to either dispose of, or return the place of purchase, any rockmelons purchased prior to 28 February.

The outbreak was ultimately determined to be due to duststorm conditions in the area.

== See also ==
- Food safety in Australia
