= 2014–2015 African cholera outbreak =

Disease outbreak in west and central Africa

- Date: June 2014-present
- Location: Ghana, Nigeria, Niger, Togo, Benin, Democratic Republic of the Congo, Ivory Coast, Chad, Liberia, Guinea-Bissau, Guinea
- Deaths: 1,475
- Injuries: Reported cases: 84,675

Declared in June 2014, the West and Central African cholera outbreak as of January 25, 2015 claimed 1,683 registered deaths and over 91,361 reported cases with a reported case fatality rate (CFR) of 2% in 11 countries, which was 3 times more than in 2013. The case fatality ratio was high in the Sahelian area, equal or greater than 2%, especially in Nigeria, Chad, Cameroon and Niger. Nigeria, Ghana and Democratic Republic of the Congo being the most affected countries with Ghana reporting its worst outbreak since 1982.

In January 2015 the Greater Accra Region and Volta region still reported cases of cholera while in the rest of Ghana the outbreak was declared over. As of January 11 the Democratic Republic of the Congo, Ghana and Nigeria are the countries with the highest number of new cases of the disease in 2015.
