= Tractatus de Herbis =

Mediaeval treatise on medicinal plants

Tractatus de herbis
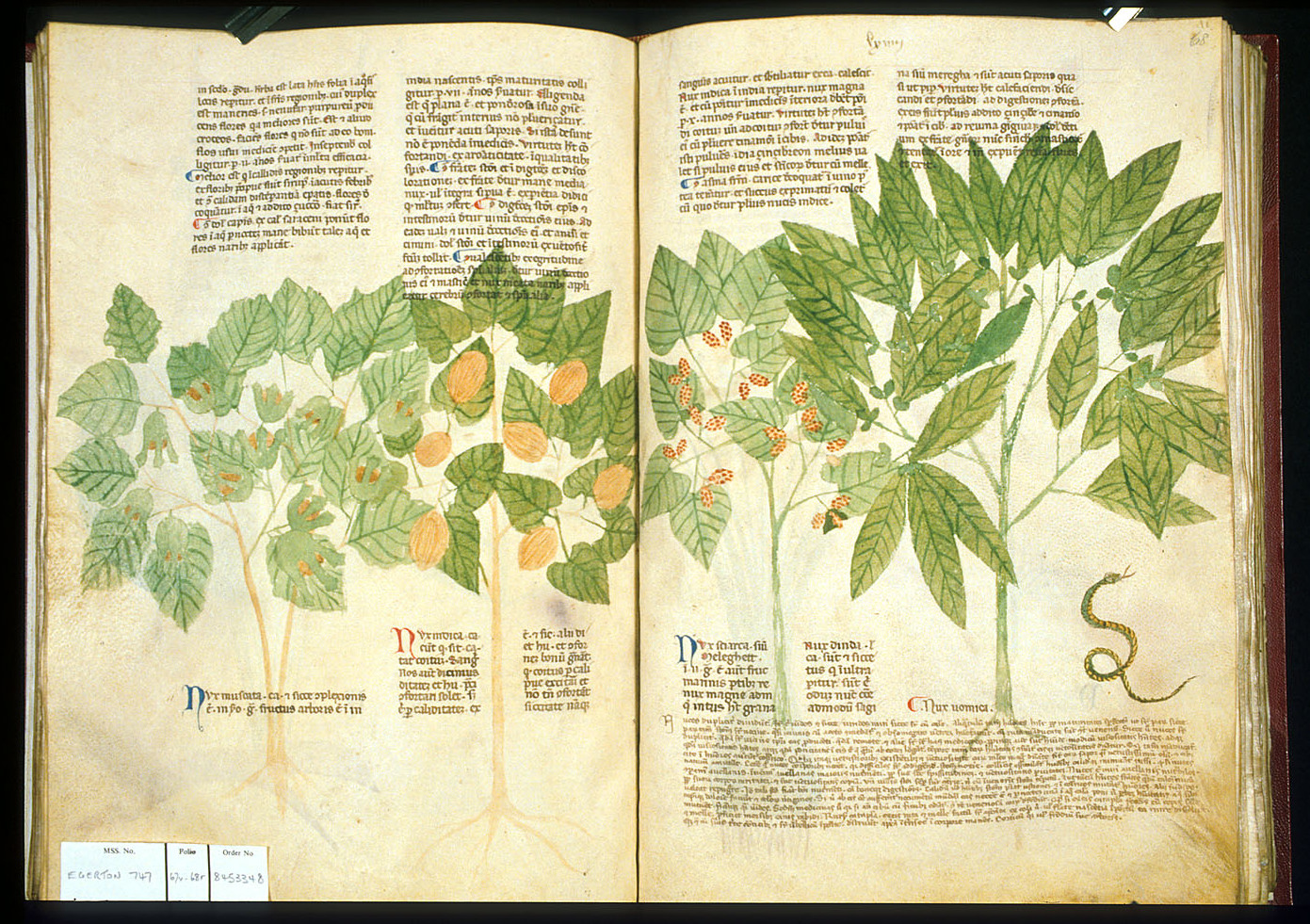
- Nutmeg, paradise seed, coconut, and nux vomica ( in ms. Egerton 747, fo 67 vo-68 ro.
- Language: Latin
- Publication place: Italy

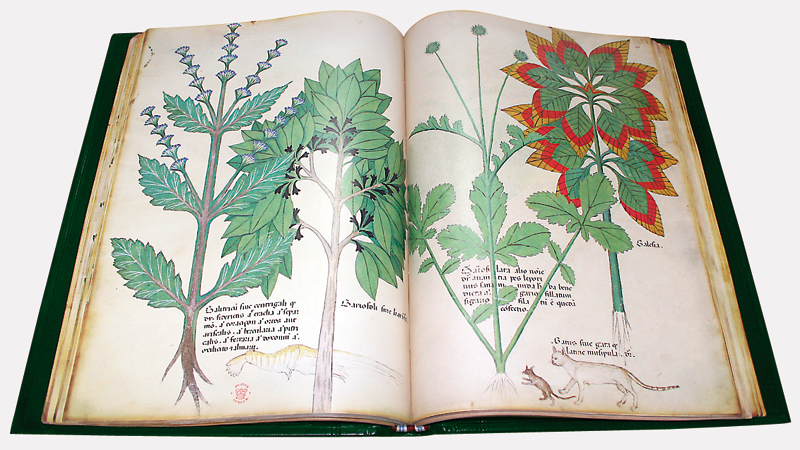
Tractatus de Herbis, Sloane MS 4016 in the British Library

The Tractatus de herbis (Treatise on Herbs), sometimes called Secreta Salernitana (Secrets of Salerno), is a textual and figural tradition of herbals handed down through several illuminated manuscripts of the Late Middle Ages. These treatises present pure plant, mineral, or animal substances with therapeutic properties. Depending on the version, there are between 500 and over 900 entries, grouped in alphabetical order. Originating in Italy, they were distributed throughout Europe and contributed to the transmission and popularity of the pharmacopeia of the Salerno School of Medicine. For example, there is a Tractatus de Herbis, an illustrated treatise of medicinal plants painted in 1440, housed under shelfmark Sloane MS 4016 in the British Library, in London.

The illustrations in these manuscripts attracted the attention of art historians from the 1950s onwards, due to their descriptive value, which was interpreted as a revival of Greek botanical illustration. Some of these plant images represent the first studies based on nature since Antiquity. The original Latin text, whose author remains unknown, comes from Circa instans, a work from the second half of the 12th century attributed to Matthaeus Platearius, and written in the Salernitan milieu. It is augmented by extracts from other late antique and early medieval sources, such as Pseudo-Apuleius, Arabic medicine handed down by Constantine the African, medieval Latin versions of Dioscorides' work, Isaac Israeli's dietary principles, and perhaps includes pharmaco-botanical knowledge from oral tradition.

The two earliest versions of the Tractatus de herbis, whose relationship is debated, are preserved in Egerton Manuscript 747 at the British Library in London and in Latin Manuscript 6823 at the Bibliothèque nationale de France in Paris. The manuscripts derived from them are mainly divided between a group originating in northern Italy, some copies of which are devoid of text, and a French translation containing almost thirty testimonies and known collectively as the Livre des simples médecines. The latter was responsible for the publication of the first herbarium printed in French, Le Grant Herbier en françoys, which underwent several reissues between the late 15th and early 16th centuries, and was in turn translated into English as the Grete Herball.

The origins of the tradition and the exact function of herbariums remain obscure and debated. While the earliest manuscripts were probably compiled as true scientific treatises, some derivative versions are more like prestige creations intended for a wealthy elite. Despite competition in the early 15th century from more naturalistic works, such as the Herbarium Carrarense, the schematic, flattened images of the Tractatus de herbis enjoyed over two centuries of popularity, before being definitively sidelined by the shimmering exoticism of New World plants.

== Background ==
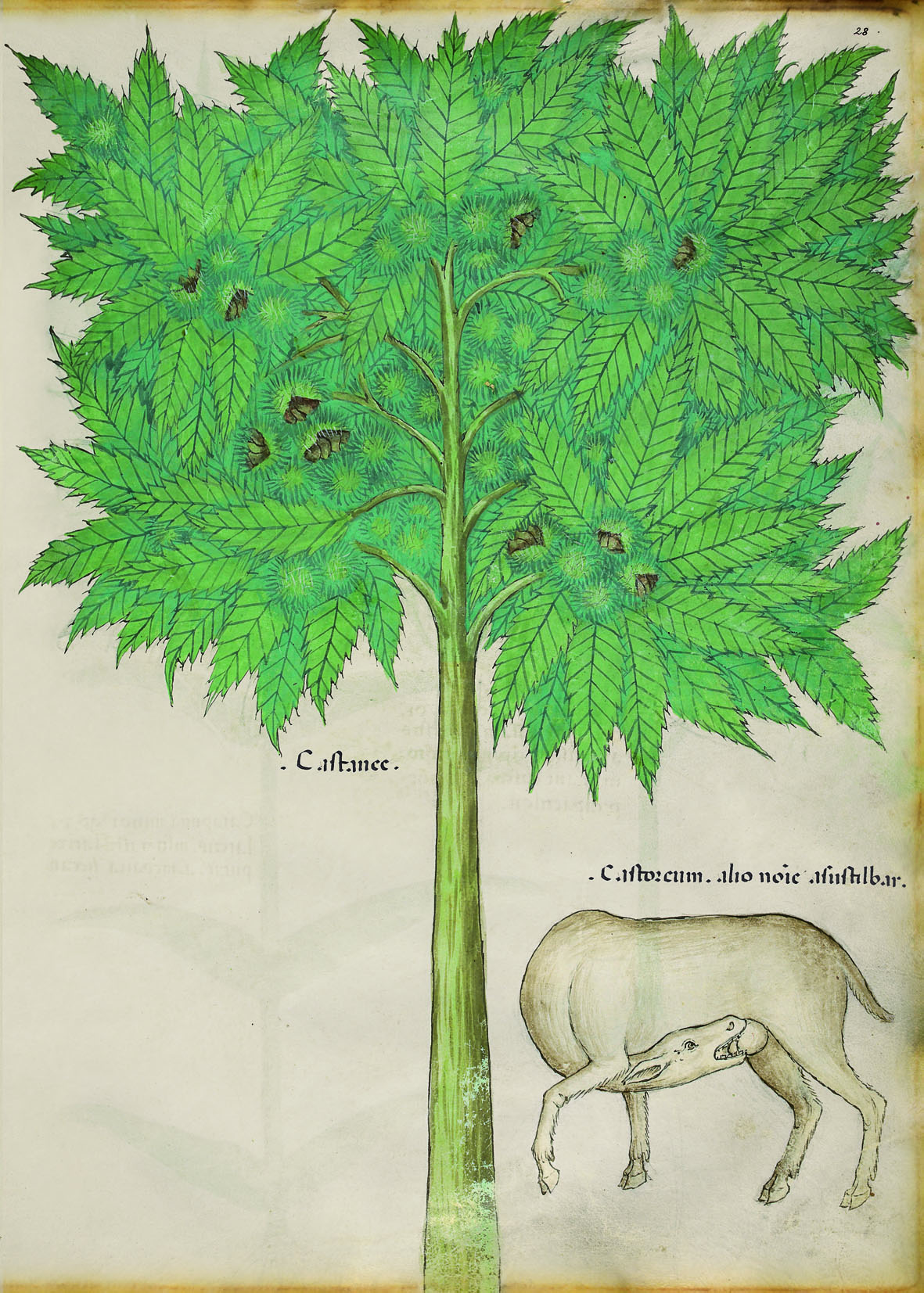
Castanea sativa (sweet chestnut) and castoreum (f. 28r) (Note: Apparently the artist has confused his animals in this picture, with his drawing of a deer-like creature. "Beavers and musk deer were sought after for castoreum and musk, respectively. The secretions from their anal glands (sometimes confused with their testicles) were used in medicine as well as in cosmetics. Ancient legend had it that when the beaver sensed he was about to be captured in a hunt, he would voluntarily castrate himself to elude capture. It is this story which this illustration in f. 28r tries to render.")

The Medieval medicine of Western Europe was much influenced by the many groups who contributed to the make-up of society. The contributions of Byzantine, Arabic and Mozarabic physicians were introduced into the Greek foundational texts of medicine, as was also the knowledge of people from further afield across the borders of the western world. Among the many results of this multiplicity of ethnic groups and cultures, medicinal plants had many different names coming from the several groups who were using them to prepare remedies. Such diversity was a source of confusions. To avoid the danger possibly generated by confusion between plants, apothecaries and physicians compiled dictionaries of plant names and commissioned albums with representations of the plants and other materia medica (animal and mineral) they used in their daily medical practice.

The Tractatus de Herbis is one such work linking the different plant names to the plants themselves through the mediation of the image. This made it possible to avoid confusion and, consequently, the risk of administering to a patient a plant different from the one prescribed by the physician. The Tractatus was produced to enable physicians, apothecaries and others identify the plants they used regardless of their nationality and language. the earliest surviving version, from the early 14th century (before 1330) and now known as Egerton 747, and in the British Library was relatively unknown till 1950, following which it was realised that there was a whole family of herbals with a common ancestor, which became collectively known as the Tractatus de herbis. These fall into two main groups, The North Italian Group (including British Library Sloane MS 4016) and the French group (including British Library Egerton MS 747).

In some manuscripts, such illustrative albums do not contain any text, but only the names of the plants in the language of the several groups present in medieval society. These albums with multilingual lists of plant names were visual aids which allowed for easy identification of the plants to be used in the practice of remedial therapy. Their representations of materia medica were much more efficient than words to make transcultural exchanges possible.

These illustrated works transformed the whole field of botanical literature. From translators/interpreters aimed to make it possible to associate one plant with its names in different languages and populations, they became reference works which made unnecessary to include plant representations in botanical and medical treatises. They became reference works of a new type which could be consulted and used by readers of any language.

== Historiography ==
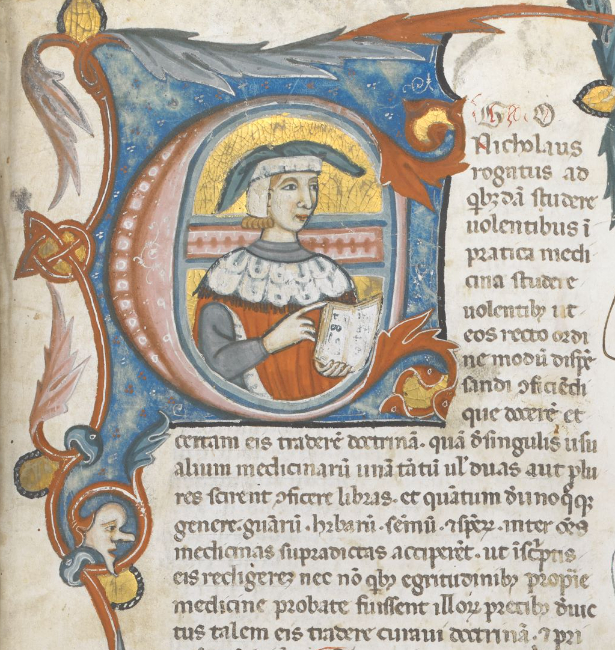
Detail of the incipit of the antidotary of ms. Egerton 747, fo 112 ro. According to Minta Collins, the style of these illuminations indicates a Salernitan origin for the codex.

The title Tractatus de herbis appears for the first time in a late 18th-century catalog of the Estense Library in Modena, to designate, within a collection of larger medical texts, a specific treatise on medical matters in Latin attributed to Dioscorides. It is derived from the explicit text that begins with the phrase Explicit tractatus herbarum ("Ends the treatise on herbs"). The treatise attracted the attention of the self-taught botanist Jules Camus, who recognized it as an amplified and illustrated version of Circa instans, a twelfth-century Latin text attributed to Matthieu Platearius and known since the second half of the eighteenth century through the works of Albrecht von Haller and, above all, Kurt Sprengel. In his study published in 1886, Camus also analyzed a second manuscript from the Estense library, which he identified as the French translation of the Tractatus de herbis and as the primitive version of a work printed at the end of the 15th century under the title Le Grant Herbier en françoys.

In 1950, the Austrian art historian Otto Pächt noted that the Modena Tractatus was merely a copy of a manuscript in London's British Library, ms. Egerton 747, and that the latter had been compiled 150 years earlier. He also established that two other versions, preserved in Florence and Rome respectively, were directly derived from the London manuscript and belonged to the same figurative tradition, which he called Secreta Salernitana. In 1974, the Swiss Felix Baumann studied the development of this tradition, alongside his work on the Carrara herbarium, and popularized the use of the term Tractatus de herbis to describe the texts contained in numerous codexes from the 13th and 14th centuries, and to distinguish them from the Circa instans from which they derive. He confirms the centrality of ms. Egerton 747 and identifies a more or less contemporary derivative version transmitted by a codex from the Bibliothèque nationale de France - Latin manuscript 6823. Baumann also proposes a division of the various Tractatus into two categories: the "Northern Italian Group" (Oberitalienische Gruppe) and the "French Manuscripts" (Französische Handschriften). The latter include the numerous Livre des simples médecines from the 15th century, including the Modenese manuscript studied by Jules Camus, and are in turn divided by Baumann into three groups according to the order of the sentences in their incipit.

This classification was called into question by François Avril when he published a critical edition of the French text contained in ms. 12322 of the Bibliothèque nationale de France. Instead, the French art historian proposed two main geographical groupings: manuscripts from Northern France and the Burgundian states, and those from Western France. These conclusions are partially contradicted by the work of Belgian historian Carmélia Opsomer, author of a two-volume edition of a Brussels manuscript likely to have originated in southern France. These works demonstrate that Livre des simples médecines are more numerous than those taken into account by previous researchers, and that they deserve to be classified not only according to their iconography but also in relation to the redaction of the text they contain.

In the 21st century, the figurative cycle of the Tractatus de herbis was the subject of a detailed chapter in Minta Collins' book on the illustrative traditions of medieval herbariums. The American researcher does not question the classifications proposed by Baumann and Avril, but argues for a Campanian origin for the two oldest manuscripts. Her work is complemented by Vera Segre Rutz's analysis of the illustrative corpus of ms. 459 from the Casanatense library, which identifies the influence of North Italian manuscripts on the artistic production of the Visconti court. In 2006, Jean Givens analyzed the evolution of the transmission of medical and botanical knowledge through the study of three versions of the Tractatus de herbis: ms. Egerton 747 from London, a Livre des simples médecines from the Royal Library in Copenhagen and a printed edition by Grete Herball. While most research has focused on iconography alone, in 2009 Iolanda Ventura published the first critical edition of the Latin text contained in ms. Egerton 747. Her analysis highlights the relationship between the Tractatus de herbis and other redactions of the Circa instans, as well as with the main pharmacological sources of Antiquity and the Middle Ages.

== Transmission ==
The Tractatus de herbis exists in two distinct versions, transmitted by the two oldest manuscripts in the tradition: the version by "Pseudo-Barthélémy Mini de Sienne", contained in ms. Egerton 747 in the British Library, and the version by Manfred de Monte Imperiale, present in ms. Latin 6823 in the Bibliothèque nationale de France. Each of these has given rise to copies, derived versions, and vernacular translations.

A family tree (Assumed links between the various manuscripts of the Tractatus de herbis, after Collins 2000 and Ventura 2009.)
  - LONDON Egerton 747 (1280-1350)
    - FLORENCE Pal. 586 (1350)
    - Livre des simples médecines (28 manuscripts) (1425-1540)
    - MODENA Lat.993=alfa.L.9.28 (1458)
    - Petroneller Kräuterbuch Mid-15th century
      - BASEL K II 11 (Mid-15th century)
  - PARIS Latin 6823 (1301-1350)
    - PARIS Masson 116 (1365-1375)
      - ROME Casan. 459 (1395-1400)
    - VATICAN Chigi F.VII.158 (Early 15th century)
    - LONDON Sloane 4016 (1440)
    - MUNICH Cim. 79 (1440)
      - VATICAN Chigi F.VIII.188 (Mid-15th century)
      - VATICAN Ross. 1067 (fifteenth century)
      - SIENNE L. VIII. 18 (Late 15th century)
      - COPENHAGEN Thott 191 2 (Late 15th century)

=== Egerton Manuscript 747 and derivatives ===
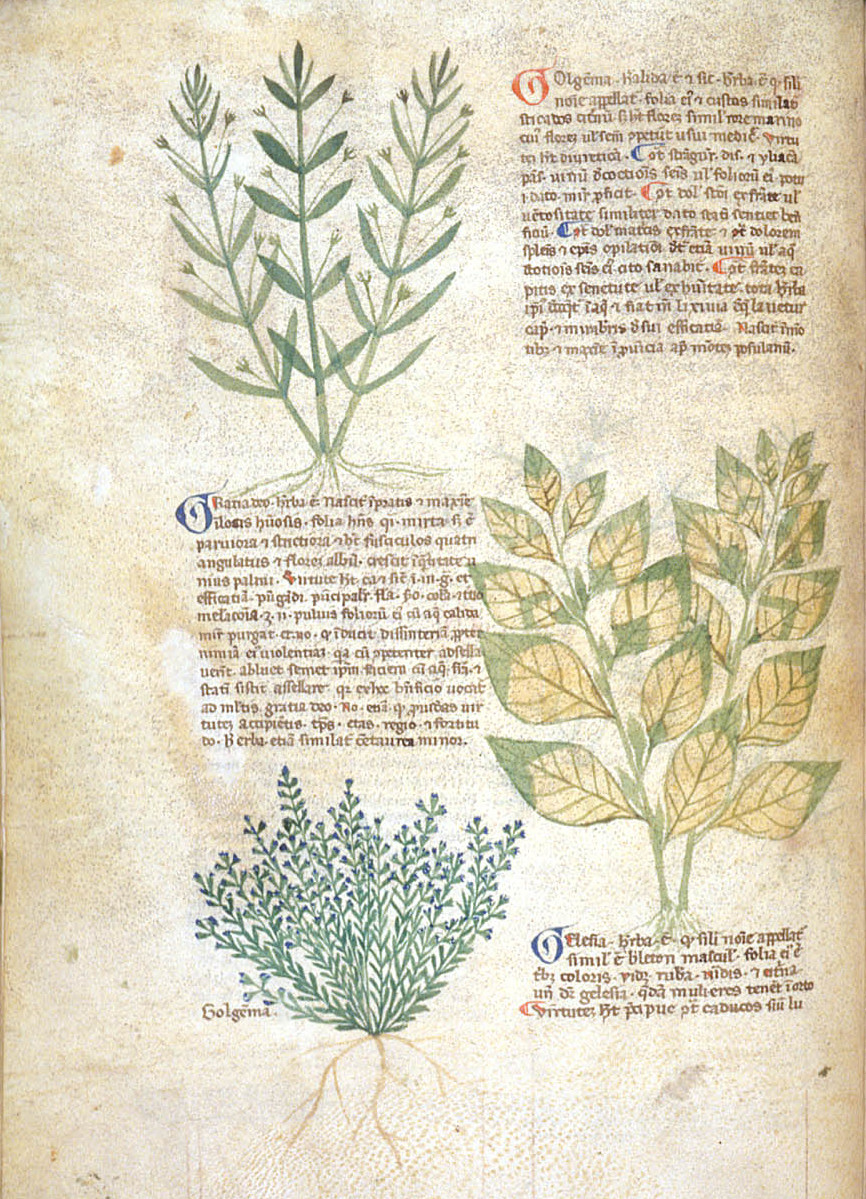
Ms. Egerton Egerton 747, fo 45 vo: the chapters De gratiadeo, De golgema and De gelesia.

The Tractatus de herbis contained in manuscript Egerton 747 (Note: The Egerton collection was originally created by a donation from Earl Francis Egerton in 1829.) in London's British Library is the earliest evidence of the treatise, and may be the original version from which all the others derive. It occupies the first 109 folios of the codex, which also contains other texts, including a Nicolas Antidotary. The treaty is signed by a man named Barthélémy Mini from Siena.

On the basis of its illustrative corpus and Gothic script, the manuscript itself is dated to a period between the last quarter of the 13th century and the first decades of the 14th century. Source analysis of the Tractatus, however, shows no use of works from after 1250, and it is possible that the work was copied from an earlier codex, or that it is based on a pre-existing text, probably unillustrated, the trace of which has been lost. The absence of references to Matthew Silvaticus's Opus pandectarum medicinae offers a potential terminus ante quem for the treatise: Silvaticus's medico-botanical encyclopedia, dedicated in 1317 to Robert d'Anjou, was a great success and was widely used by teachers at the Salerno school. It is unlikely that the Tractatus was written after this date, and that its author would have been unaware of the existence of such a source or chosen not to include it in his compilation. The geographical origin of ms. Egerton 747 is also obscure: some authors have suggested that it was compiled in Tuscany, more precisely in Sienne, while others consider it to have originated in southern Italy, in the Naples or Salerno region. These attempts at localization are all based on the illustrations in the manuscript, as the text itself offers no clues as to its origin, and it may have been written in any part of the Italian peninsula, then copied into the codex. Whatever its exact provenance, the manuscript quickly crossed the Alps and must have been in French hands at a fairly early date. Indeed, there is an abridged version of the treaty translated into Occitan around 1350, and a direct copy of the manuscript made in Bresse in 1458. The numerous accounts of the French edition known as the Livre des simples médecines also seem to derive from a single translation of a text very similar to that of the London manuscript.

Two clues suggest that the Tractatus de herbis in ms. Egerton 747 is an original compilation. Firstly, extracts from Isaac Israeli were added to the margins of the manuscript after the first draft, whereas these passages are integrated into the body of the text and quoted in the summaries of later versions. In addition, the last folios of the treatise are ruled only at the top of the columns, to allow for the insertion of illustrations and to prevent paint from accumulating in the recessed lines. This adaptation of the illumination process, which took place in the course of production, indicates a close collaboration between the scribe and the illustrators, which could be the sign of an original figurative undertaking, rather than the copying of an existing work. The Egerton manuscript, the earliest version and acquired by the British Museum in 1839, is incomplete.

==== Provençal translation ====
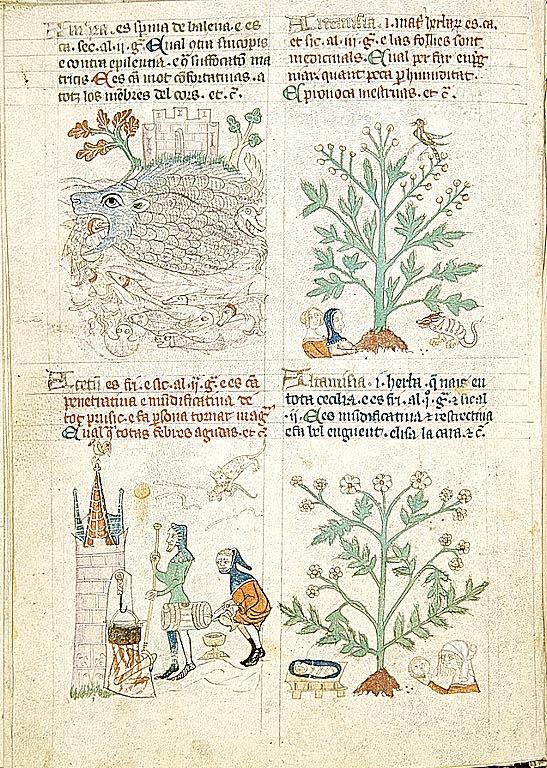
Ms. Palatino 586, f^{o} 12 v^{o} : De ambra, De aceto, De arthemisia tagantes et De arthemisia leptaphilos.

In Manuscript Palatino 586 from the Biblioteca Nazionale Centrale in Florence, each folio features four images surmounted by three to six lines of text, rarely one or two, in Occitan, with abbreviations. They correspond to condensed translations of each chapter of the ms. Egerton 747. The incomplete codex was produced in two separate campaigns. It opens with a series of quatrains containing the Dits de philosophes, at the bottom of which the copyist gives his name ("Aguiton") in a Latin formula common among medieval scribes: "Nomen scriptoris: aguito plenus amoris "ref 4. This is followed by portraits of seven "doctors" delivering aphorisms in Latin and Occitan (see below). Folios 9 to 29 contain the first series of simples, which follow the chapter order of ms. Egerton 747. The plants are surrounded by figures and grotesques. The first part of the manuscript, which dates from the middle of the 14th century, ends with the letter F. Folios 30 to 65 contain only images, and from folio 38 onwards, only preparatory drawings in black line are present. This second illustration campaign was carried out using a different technique and in a style similar to that of Jean de Sy's Master of the Bible. This illuminator would have appeared during the last years of the reign of John the Good, and would have frequently worked for Charles V. It is therefore possible that ms. Pal. 586 was brought to Paris from the South of France to be decorated for a royal patron in the years 1370–1375.

==== Bresse copy ====
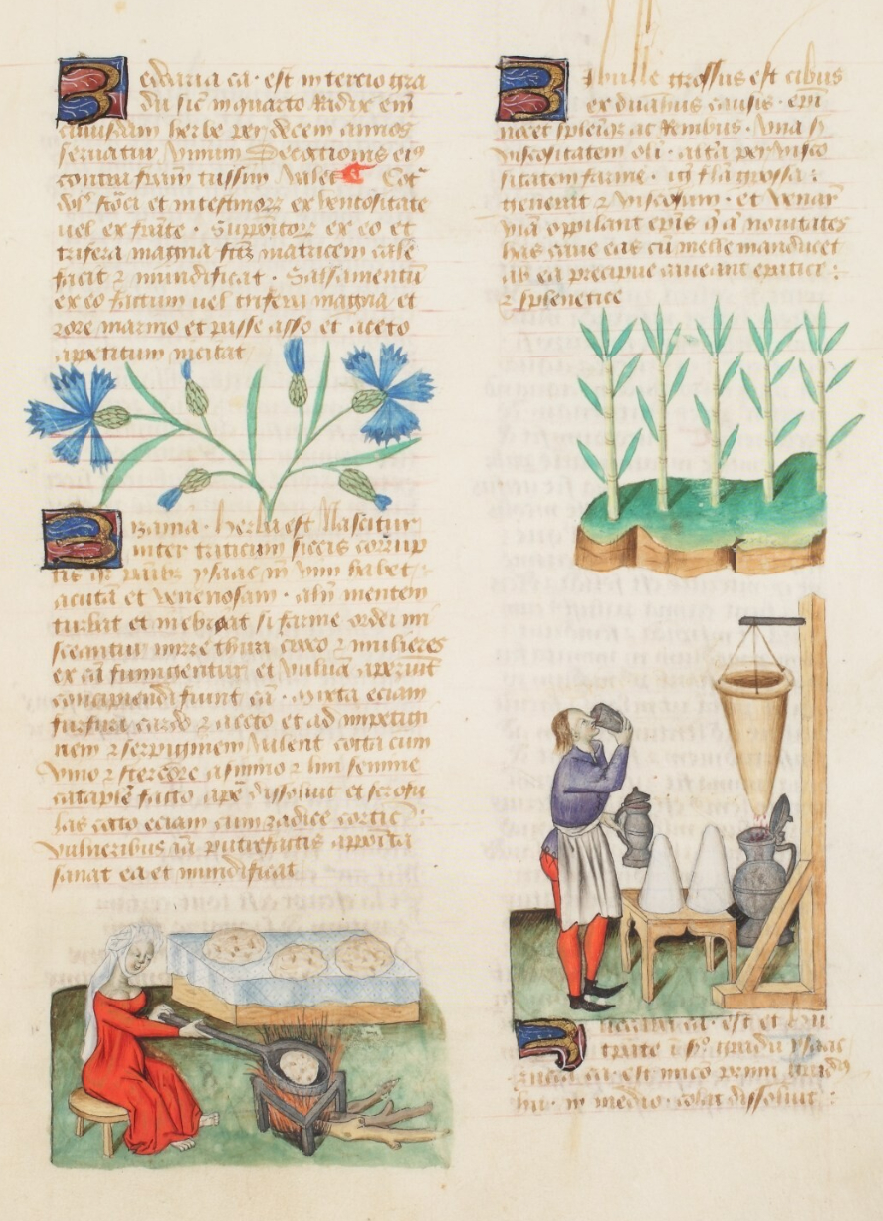
Ms. alfa.l.09.28, f^{o} 142 r^{o} : De zedoaria, De zizania, De zibullis et De zuchara.

Manuscript alfa.l.09.28 (formerly ms. Lat. 993) from the Estense Library in Modena is a 15th-century Latin version, very close to that of ms. Egerton 747, and the first to be given the title Tractatus de herbis. It even contains the explicit with the (usurped) signature of Barthélémy Mini de Sienne, whose surname was mistranscribed as "Mundsens" in the library catalogue. The treatise includes 390 images of plants, 50 of minerals and other substances, often depicted in boxes, and 22 unframed illuminated scenes. The illustrator may have been the Master of the Prince of Piedmont, an artist known for his work for the future Duke Amédée IX of Savoy. The last folio of the treatise includes a second explicit in French, following the one already present in ms. Egerton 747, which provides information on the provenance of the manuscript (Bourg-en-Bresse), the date of its completion (1458) and the name of its copyist ("Le petit pelous"):

Explicit this herbology

To which an affair has been made

In bourg it was script

One thousand fifty and eight

And wrote it all certain

The owner with his hand

Please pray for him

For the love of your company

- Le petit pelous, etc., 1458

=== Central European Kräuterbuch ===
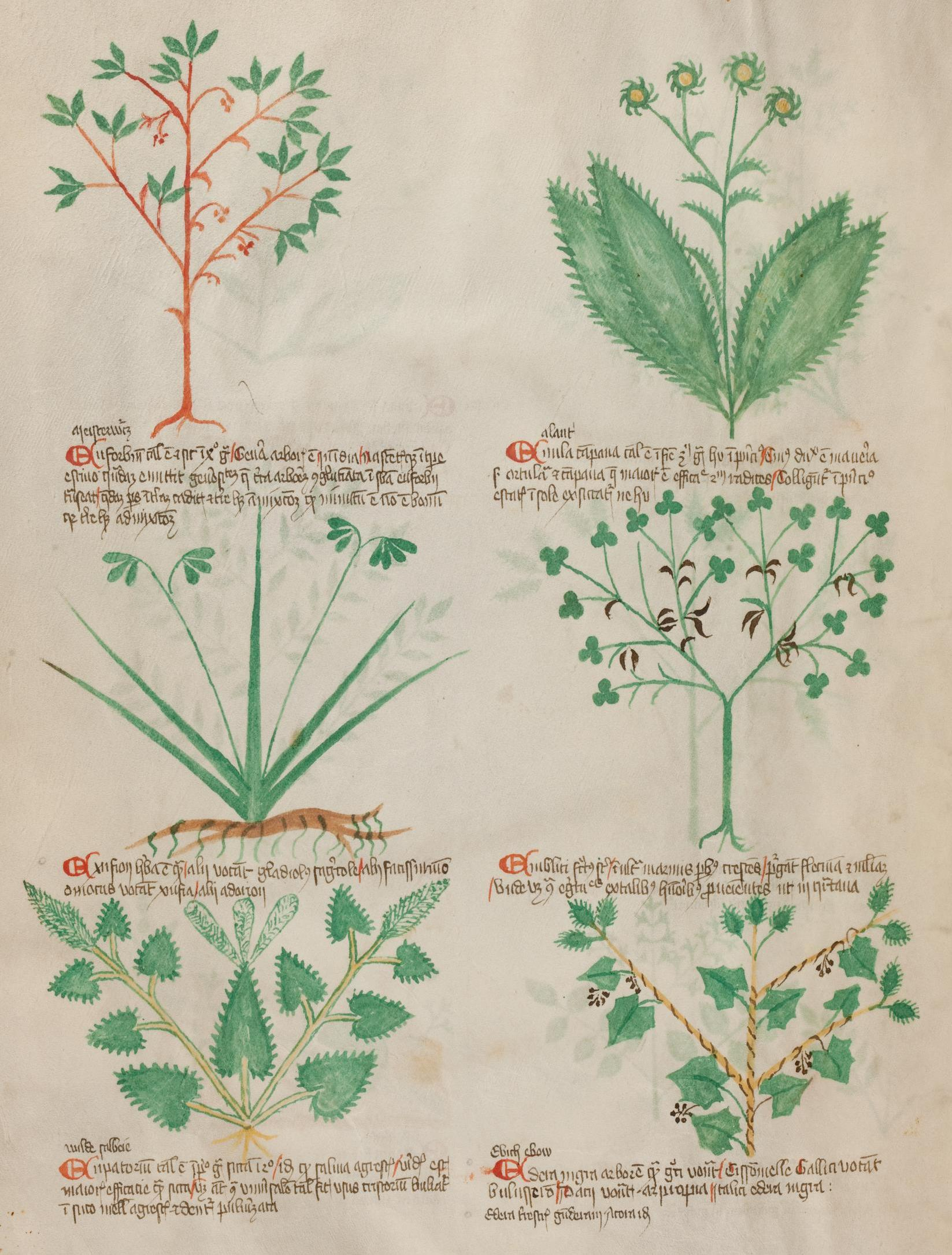
Ms. K II 11, fo 11 vo: plants with the initial E.

In addition to the two groups of manuscripts defined by Felix Baumann, an abridged version of the Tractatus de herbis has been transmitted by two manuscripts from the Germanic cultural area. It is limited to substances of plant origin and has been purged of all medical data, retaining only lexicographical information. The text, which is accompanied by illustrations, is comparable to the ms. Egerton 747.

One of these Kräuterbuch ("Book of Herbs"), comprising just 200 chapters, is contained in ms. K II 11 of the Basel University Library. It was the subject of a critical edition in 1961, which dated it to the end of the 14th century based on the costume worn by the character in its only figurative scene. In 1990, however, the discovery of a second manuscript rendered this initial analysis obsolete: the "Petroneller Kräuterbuch", so nicknamed because it was kept in the library of the castle of the Counts of Abensberg-Traun in Petronell, Austria, turns out to be the model for the Basel manuscript and dates from the mid-15th century6. The codex was sold at auction at Sotheby's in 1985 and is now in private hands. The codex has a specificity for the history of the transmission of the Tractatus de herbis: an anonymous reader at the end of the 15th century inserted between the pages additional folios with the complete translation of the text into German, in a dialect of the Austro-Bavarian group.

=== Latin manuscript 6823 and Northern Italian group ===
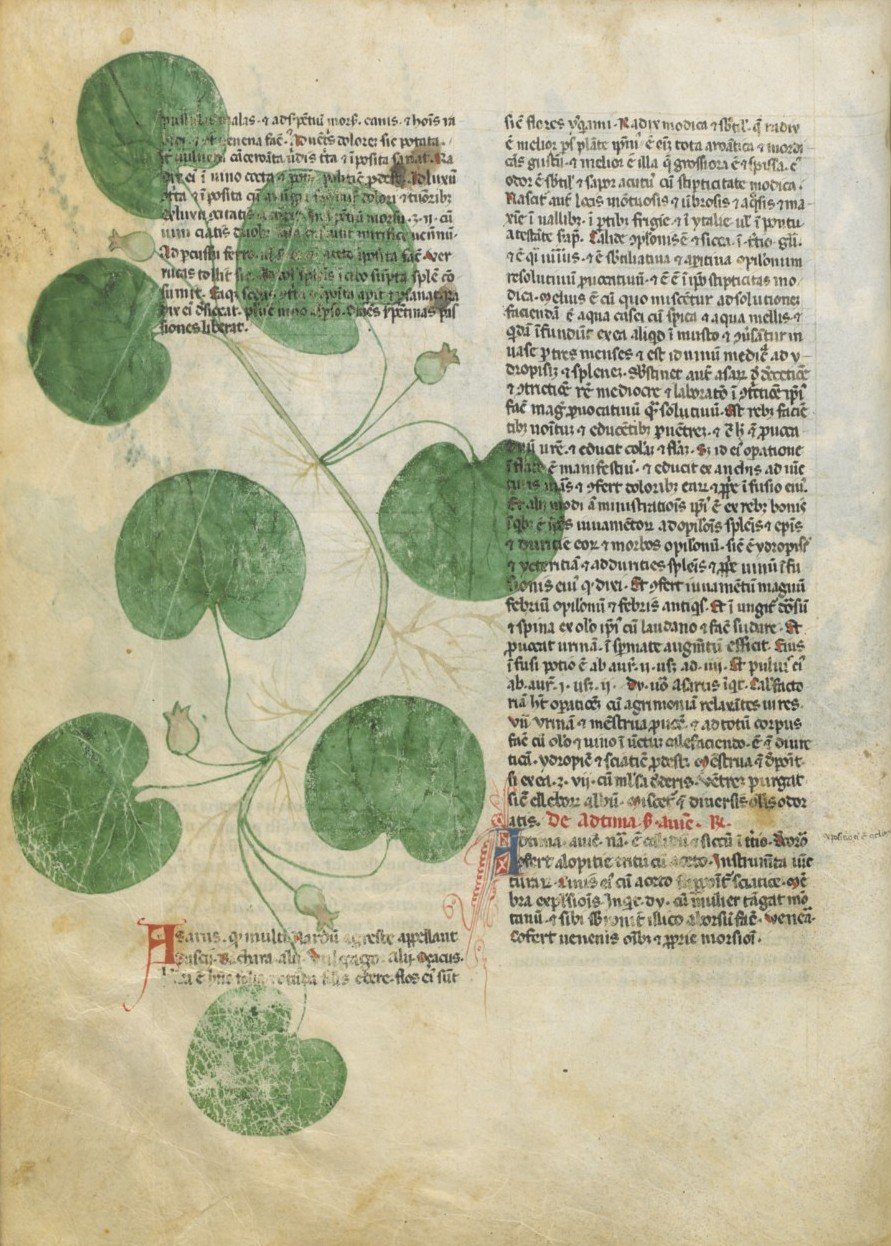
Ms. Latin 6823, f^{o} 16 v^{o}: De asaro.

Latin manuscript 6823 at the Bibliothèque nationale de France in Paris contains a version of the Tractatus de herbis, entitled "Liber de herbis et plantis", which is different from that of ms. Egerton 747. Its signature indicates that it was written and illustrated by Manfred de Monte Imperiale, an unknown author whose origin is the subject of debate. The work could not be precisely dated, and would have been written between the end of the 13th century and the beginning of the 14th century. However, the terminus post quem date of 1296 has been retained, due to the presence of extracts from Simon of Genoa's Clavis sanationis, which appeared no later than that year. The geographical origin of Latin ms. 6823 is as much debated as that of ms. Egerton 747, although the illustrations on the preface folios may point to a Neapolitan production (see below). Apart from the Paris manuscript, the "Manfred version" was transmitted by four other codices dating from the 15th century: mss. Ross. 1067 and Chigi F. VIII. 188 from the Vatican Apostolic Library, ms. L. VIII. 18 from the Biblioteca comunale degli Intronati in Sienae (Note: Known as the "Codex Sermoneta" after its first owner, the 14th-century Sienese physician Alessandro Sermoneta.) and ms. Thott 191 2° from the Royal Library in Copenhagen, which is incomplete and lacks illustrations.

Manfred's writing sweeps across a more varied cultural horizon than Pseudo-Barthélémy Mini's. The link between the two works has not yet been elucidated and is the subject of debate among scholars. They agree in drawing parallels between the illustrative corpus of the London and Paris codices. The text, on the other hand, shows differences that make the hypothesis of a direct relationship between the two manuscripts unlikely. If Manfred had ms. Egerton 747 on his desk, he would have consciously and systematically replaced the content of certain chapters with texts taken from other sources (see below). Another explanation is that he used a version of the treatise containing illustrations derived from that of the London manuscript, but a substantially different text. A third hypothesis is that both versions are descended from a common archetype, which would have undergone distinct developments.

Whatever the answer to this question, Manfred's version represents an essential step in the history of the transmission of the Tractatus de herbis and the extended, illustrated versions of Circa instans. Having probably been found in Lombardy as early as the second half of the 14th century, it served as the basis for some of the most famous accounts of the work, collected by Baumann under the name of the "Northern Italian group " . This migration from the south of the peninsula, if Latin ms. 6823 was indeed produced in this region, is the subject of an elaborate hypothesis: the manuscript may have belonged to Francesco da Carrara, lord of Padua from 1350 onwards. This acquisition is perhaps linked to the gradual transfer of Salerno's center of medical knowledge and teaching northwards, first to Bologna, then to Padua through the efforts of the House of Carrara to develop its university. When the city was taken by Jean Galéas Visconti in 1388, books were listed as spoils of war, and in 1426 the Latin ms. 6823 was mentioned in the catalog of the Library of the Dukes of Milan. A few years later, Francesco's son Francesco II commissioned a superb manuscript known as the Carrara Herbarium, whose images were partly inspired by Manfred's treatise. Unable to physically recover his father's books, Francesco II may have attempted to replace the loss by creating a new illuminated manuscript.

==== Padua and Lombardy picture books ====
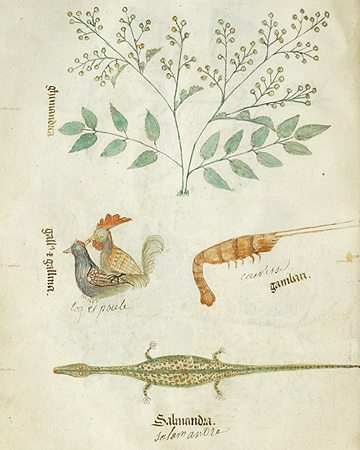
Ms. M. M. 873, fo 50 vo: A plant (De ghimandrea) and a few animals: rooster and hen, crayfish, salamander.

The oldest manuscript in the Northern Italian group appears to be ms. M. 873 from the Morgan Library and Museum in New York, entitled Compendium Salernitanum. It is unusual in that it contains only illustrations, although a separate volume with text may have existed. The 488 images, all by the same hand, follow the order of those in Manfred's version. The chapters without illustrations are not represented, but the New York manuscript includes, alongside the simple ones, the animals from the Liber medicinae ex animalibus. Analysis of the costumes and handwriting has enabled us to place its origin in northern Italy, probably in the Veneto region, and to date it to the third quarter of the 14th century. As indicated in a note on folio 94, the codex belonged to Marcellin-Hercule Bompart, physician to Louis XIII, whose library was subsequently passed on to Antoine Vallot, archiatrist to Louis XIV. Many titles are translated into French in cursive script of the 15th or 16th century.

A second, textless manuscript is held by the library of the École nationale des Beaux-Arts in Paris under the Masson number 116. (Note: The manuscript belongs to a collection bequeathed to the library by the collector Jean Masson in 1925.) A hard-to-decipher note (Note: Interpreted as "J. Bacciarinus 4 denariorum in Padua 20 febr. MCCCLXII".) at the bottom of the first folio, as well as several iconographic clues, link the codex to the city of Padua. The 580 illustrations, whose uneven level reflects the participation of several artists, are presented in an order now disrupted by a clumsy restoration of the binding and which does not correspond to the original sequence. Unlike the Morgan Library manuscript, ms. Masson 116 was not originally designed to contain images only: the folios show traces of a discreet pen and ink rule, and the trees are placed in the center of the pages to allow the insertion of two columns of text. The details of the costumes and certain scenes show many similarities with the illustrations of a Guiron le Courtois and a Lancelot du Lac transmitted by two Parisian manuscripts, (Note: Respectively NAF (Nouvelles acquisitions françaises) 5243 [archive] and Français 343 [archive], held at the Bibliothèque nationale de France.) suggesting that they may have come from the same workshop, and have made it possible to date ms. Masson 116 to the years 1370 or 1380. The work of some of the manuscript's illustrators also corresponds closely to the stylistic canons of Altichiero da Zevio or Jacopo Avanzi, two artists who worked in Padua between 1376 and 1379.

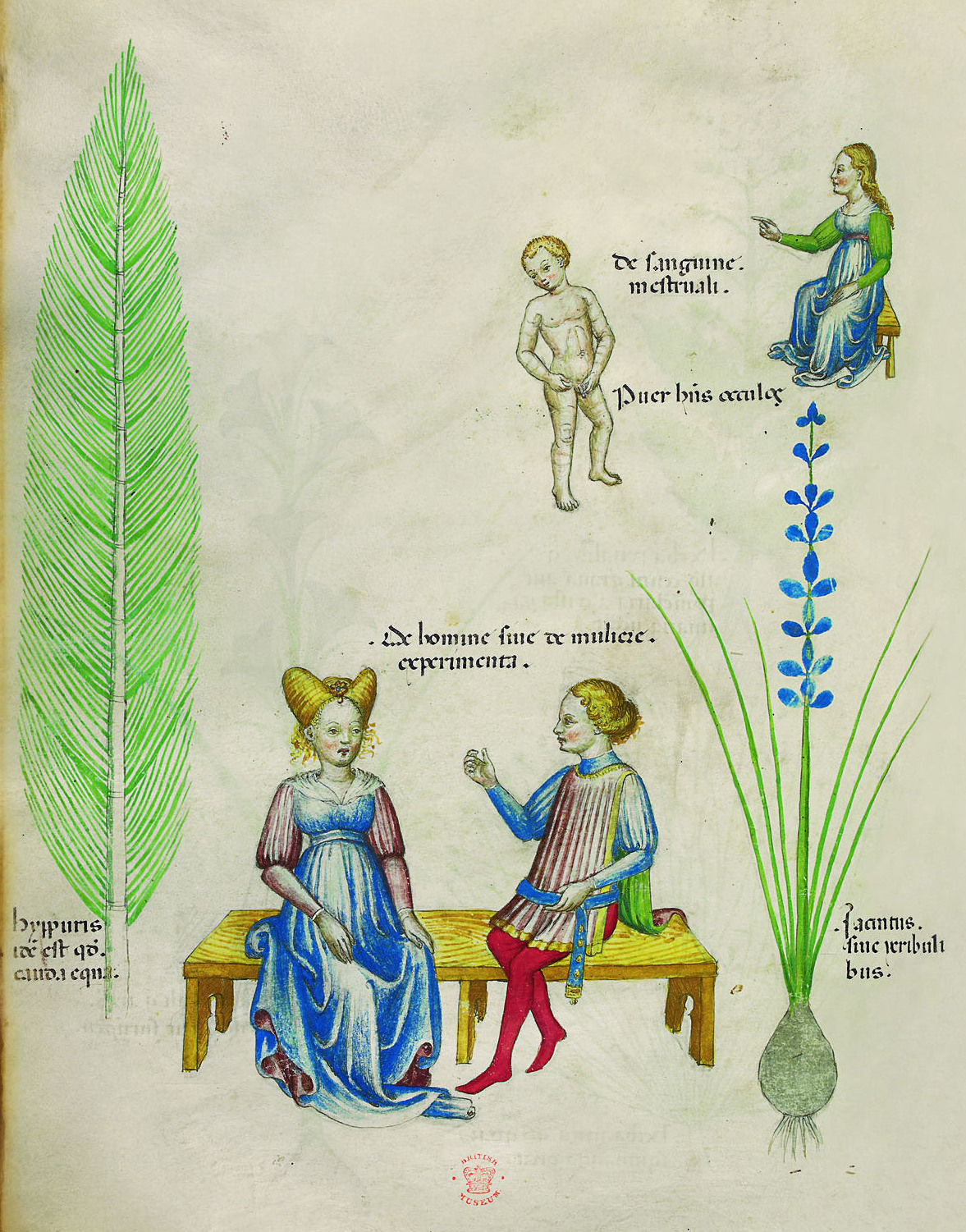
Ms. Sl. 4016, fo 44 vo: courtly scene amidst simple medicines.

Although apparently unintentional, the absence of text in ms. Masson 116 seems to have served a remarkable tendency in the 15th and 16th centuries to prefer picture books to scientific treatises. The École des Beaux-Arts manuscript, or a copy of it, thus served as the basis for two books designed to feature only illustrations. The first is ms. Chigi F. VII. 158 from the Vatican Apostolic Library, dated to the late 14th or early 15th century. Although it is labelled "Latin Dioscorides" and has been studied as such, the codex contains only images belonging to the figurative tradition of the Tractatus de herbis. The second is British Library manuscript Sloane 4016, whose illustrations are almost identical copies of those on ms. Masson 116, but adjusted and grouped to fill the entire surface of the folios. They are accompanied by captions indicating the name of the simple and its synonyms, and feature scenes that indicate a clear predilection on the part of their patron for courtly and worldly aspects, testifying to a realization with a primarily aesthetic purpose. Details of costumes and hairstyles have been altered from the original and have been used to date the manuscript to the 1440s, by comparison with the frescoes attributed to the Zavattari in the chapel of Queen Theodelinde in Monza Cathedral. The link with this family of Lombard painters, as well as the presence of Visconti (Note: The imperial eagle on the soldier's shield on fo 10 vo, or the leopard collar on fo 50 ro.) emblems, would place the origin of ms. Sloane 4016 to Pavia or Milan. Other authors, however, have suggested a Venetian production around 1450.

Some of the illustrations in ms. Masson 116 still appear in a distinct 15th-century tradition commonly referred to as "alchemical herbariums", of which there are around twenty manuscripts originating in Italy. The best-known examples are ms. 106 from the botanical library of the University of Florence and ms. Aldini 211 from the University Library of Pavie both of which have been the subject of detailed studies. (Note: The ms. Aldini 211 is itself classified by Felix Baumann in the Northern Italian group of the Tractatus de herbis) These codices are divided into two parts: the first presenting 98 illustrated "alchemical" plants, and the second containing a selection of images from the Tractatus de herbis tradition, interspersed with texts.

Sloane 4016:

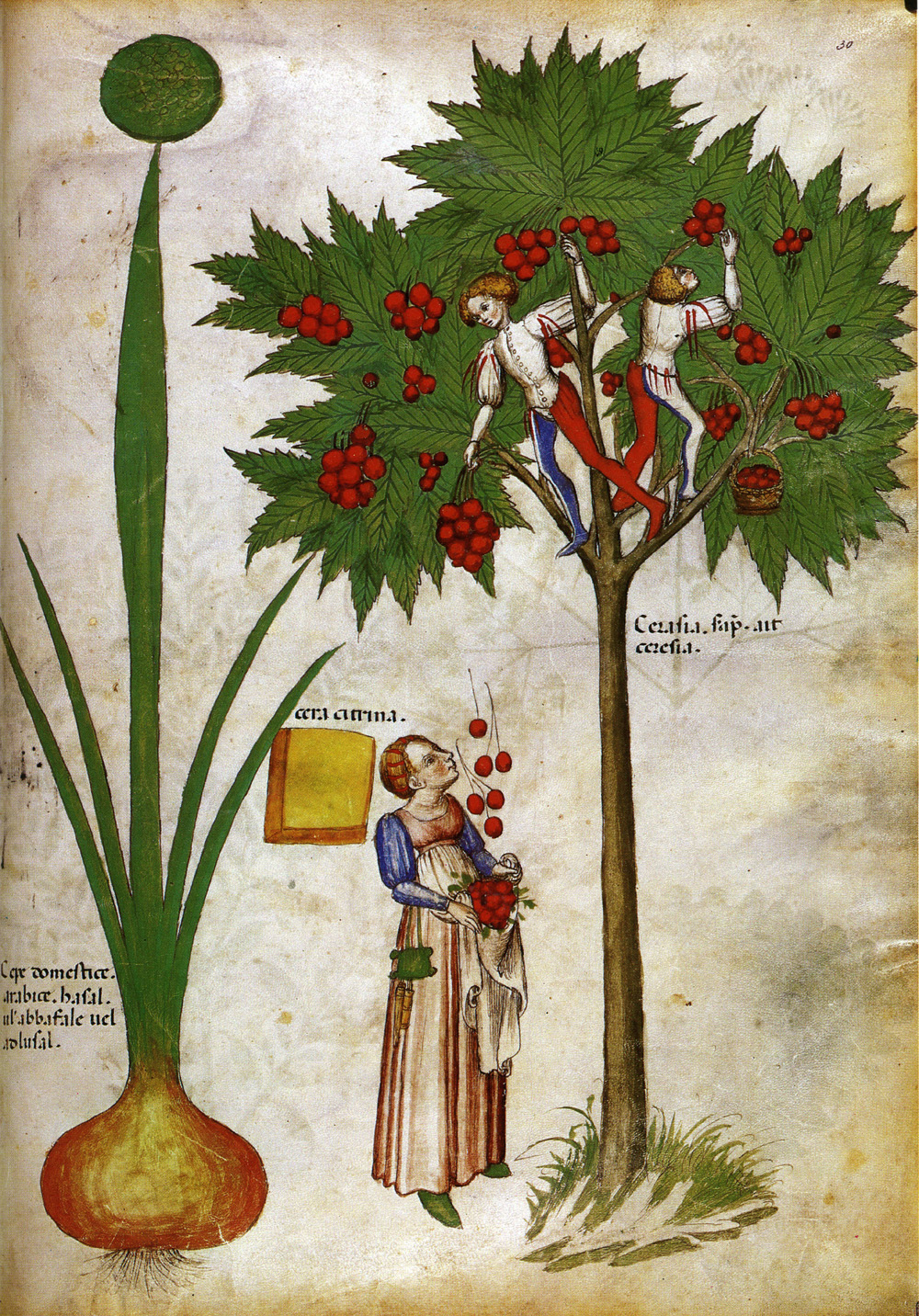
Garden onion; yellow wax; cherries (f. 30r)

The Sloane manuscript is a volume with 109 folios of large parchment, (365 mm x 265 mm) It is illustrated with nearly 500 polychrome representations of plants, animals and minerals, which were all used as primary materials to produce drugs. These illustrations also include some people (ff. 2r, 44v, 98v), a mummy (f. 62r), animals’ parts (antlers, for example, on f. 34v), and manufactured by-products (wax, f. 30r). Though this manuscript lacks a signature, colophon, or any indication of its provenance or date, it has traditionally been considered to be of North Italian origin, most likely from the Lombardy region from about 1440 judging from its Gothic-style script. Later, it belonged to the Marquis of Magny, Nicolas-Joseph Foucault (1643-1721), then to the English collector Hans Sloane (1660-1753), before it became part of the collections of the British Museum in 1839.

=== Reproductions ===
In 2002 the Folio Society reproduced the Tractatus de Herbis in a numbered limited edition of 1000, accompanied by a commentary volume written by Minta Collins with list of plants compiled by Sandra Raphael. In 2011 the Spanish publishing house M. Moleiro Editor produced a facsimile edition of the Tractatus de Herbis. This edition limited to 987 copies comes with a companion volume by Historian of Science and Medicine Alain Touwaide of the Institute for the Preservation of Medical Traditions and the (Smithsonian Institution).

==== Historia plantarum: a sum for Wenceslas ====
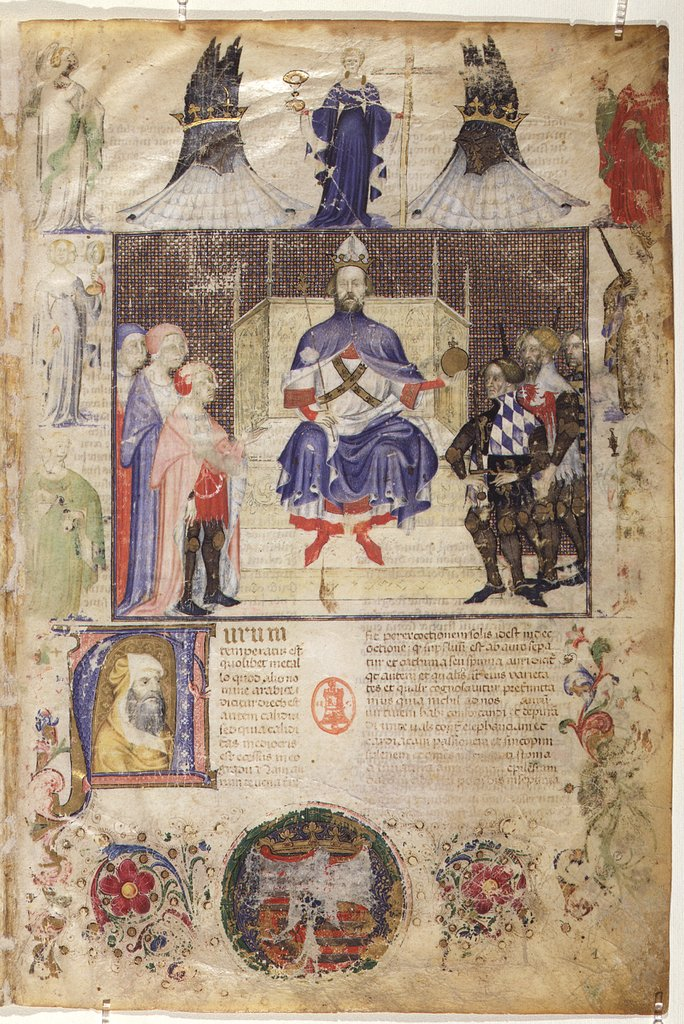
Ms. Casanatense 459, fo 1 ro: frontispiece and chapter dedicated to gold (De auro).

It was at the court of the Visconti family that the most luxurious version of Manfred's treatise was produced: ms. 459 from the Casanatense library in Rome, otherwise known as the Historia plantarum, is a grandiose edition of over 900 entries that represents the pinnacle of medieval scientific illustration. Its design and border decoration correspond to the style employed by Giovannino and Salomone de' Grassi for the Book of Hours commissioned by Jean Galéas Visconti. It is likely that the Historia plantarum was produced in the same workshop, by the same artists and for the same patron39. The representation of plant species follows in the tradition of the Tractatus de herbis, and closely resembles that of ms. Masson 116, which could suggest an archetype common to both manuscripts. On the other hand, that of the animals and figurative scenes differs markedly: it corresponds more closely to the studies carried out in the de' Grassi workshop, and has many points in common with the contemporary production of the Tacuinum sanitatis illustrated in the Lombard region.

The manuscript may date from the period 1394–1395, when Jean Galéas was trying to persuade the King of the Romans to invest him with the Duchy of Milan in exchange for financial support. Wenceslas of Luxembourg, to whom the work was presented, is depicted on the frontispiece surrounded by his electors and the seven virtues. The latter may be an allusion to the title of Count of Vertus conferred on Jean Galéas after his marriage to Isabelle de France. The manuscript was later inherited by the famous library of King Matthias Corvin in Hungary, who had his coat of arms placed over that of the House of Luxembourg on the same frontispiece.

A copy of the Historia plantarum was produced in the 15th century during this stay in Hungary. Transmitted by ms. Cim. 79 (formerly ms. 604 2°) of the University Library of Munich, and known as the Lexicon plantarum, it was essentially limited to simple plants. Written in bastard Latin script, the manuscript was probably originally intended for a hospital.

=== Books of simple medicines and printed works ===
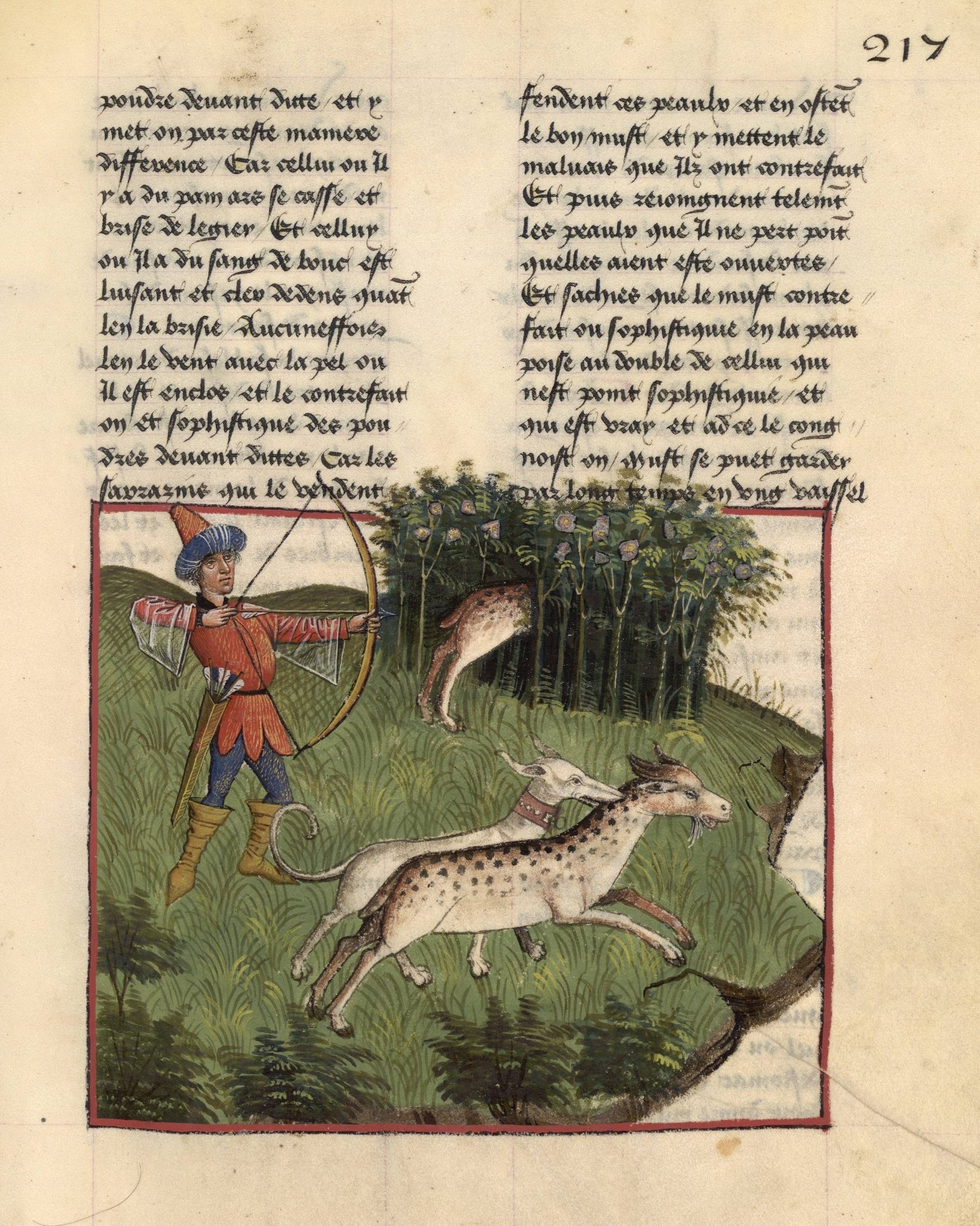
Chasse au porte-musc in French ms. 12319 from the Bibliothèque nationale de France, fo 217 ro.

The Tractatus de herbis was translated into French, commonly known as the Livre des simples médecines, at the end of the 14th century or the beginning of the 15th century. In France, this period corresponds to the transition from Latin to the vernacular of many scientific and philosophical works. The vernacular version was transmitted by at least 28 manuscripts, alternately titled Livre des secrets de Salerne or Arboriste. The earliest date from the second quarter of the 15th century, and the majority from the second half of that century. The Livre des simples médecines is clearly derived from the Pseudo-Barthélémy Mini version: it contains the same chapters, presented in the same sequence, and strictly adheres to alphabetical order, even when the transition to French would have required otherwise. (Note: For example, "aurum" became "or" (gold).) It does, however, show certain specific features that might suggest that the original translation was not based on ms. Egerton 747, but from another codex containing a derived version, closer to that of Modè's (Note: Moreover, this manuscript cannot be the source of the translation, as it predates the first accounts of the Book of Simple Medicines by several decades.) ms. alfa.l.09.28. Finally, while the stemma codicum of the Livre des simples médecines tends to indicate a unique archetype, the original translation developed over time and evolved into several sub-editions, according to what its copyists felt authorized to add or subtract. Some of these contain extracts from the work of the Italian physician Gentile da Foligno and the Tacuinum sanitatis, two sources absent from earlier versions of treatise.

==== Grands herbiers ====
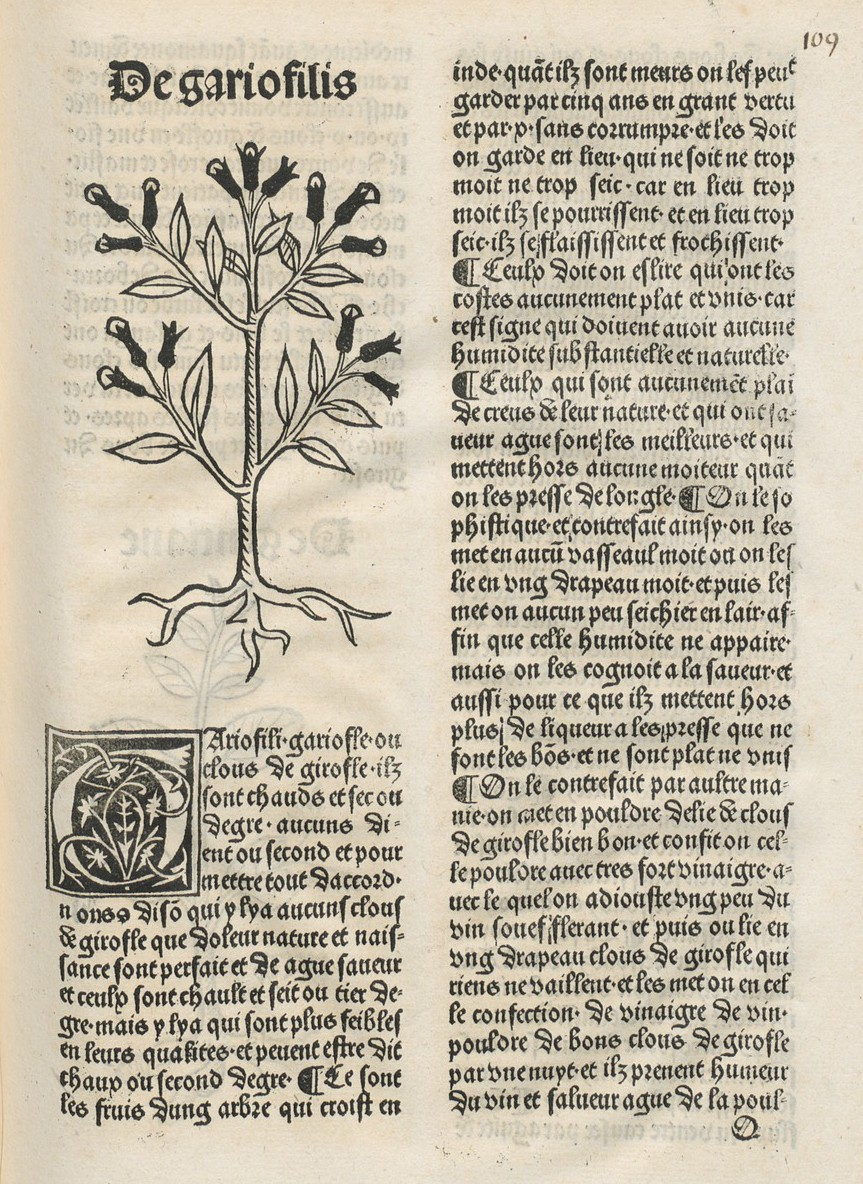
Arbolayre (1486), p. 109: De gariofilis chapter.

It was precisely one of these redactions that was used to produce the first printed herbarium in the French language: published in Besançon in 1486 or 1487–1488, it was entitled Arbolayre contenant la qualitey et virtus, proprietey des herbes, arbres, gommes et semences, extrait de pluseurs tratiers de medicine, comment d'Avicenne, de Rasis, de Constantin, de Ysaac et Plateaire, selon le commun usaige bien correct. (Note: The term "arbolayre" is a distortion of the Latin herbolarium or herbarium, and always refers to a "book of herbs".) The work is a large folio in Gothic script on two columns, which was reprinted in Paris at least twice, in 1498 and 1520, this time under the name Grant Herbier en françoys. The woodcuts in these works no longer follow the iconographic tradition of the Tractatus de herbis, but seem to have been borrowed from the Gart der Gesundheit, the first herbarium printed in German, published in Mainz in 1485. The text of the Arbolayre has a number of remarkable features that distinguish it from all versions derived from the Tractatus de herbis and the Livre des simples médecines, such as the presence of chapters absent elsewhere. As it seems unlikely that the editor himself would have taken the initiative of making such additions to an existing work, this means that the manuscript at the source of these impressions has yet to be determined.

The Grant Herbier was in turn translated into English as the Grete Herball and published several times between 1526 and 1561. The work is dedicated to "the perfect knowledge and understanding of all kinds of herbs and their gracious virtues" (Note: Parfyt knowledge and under standyng of all maner of herbes & there gracyous vertues.) and incorporates a number of novelties: a register of chapters in Latin and English, an anatomical diagram showing the names of different human bones, a section devoted to 25 treatments presented as "innovative" or a treatise on urine attributed to Avicenna.

== Text ==
=== Material processed ===
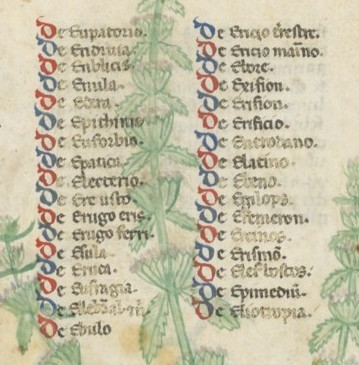
Summary of the initial E in Latin ms. 6823 from Paris.

The Tractatus de herbis consists of an alphabetical compilation of over 500 simples, each chapter devoted to the description of a different product. The enumeration begins after a short prologue from Circa instans, which explains that a simple medicine is a substance used as found in nature, without additions or modifications. Each initial begins with a summary, which does not always correspond exactly to the products actually processed. Within the same alphabetical section, the chapters follow a sequence that does not respect alphabetical order, but seems dictated by the sources used for compilation. The treatise is mainly made up of plants and substances of plant origin, but also includes several simple animals (such as ambergris, castoreum and musk) and minerals (such as mercury, orpiment and magnetite). It also contains a number of processed products, such as starch, butter, vinegar and... mummies.

The internal organization of the chapters varies according to the sources used. Those taken from Circa instans, however, all share a similar structure: they begin by mentioning the qualities of the simple (hot or cold, dry or wet) and their degree of intensity, then provide lexicographical information, such as synonyms and sometimes the etymology of the name, and finally indicate the substance's secondary qualities (astringent action) as well as the mood it serves to regulate (blood, phlegm, bile, atrabile). After this introduction, which constitutes a kind of "identity card" for the product, the text goes on to list its various therapeutic properties. These are grouped by body part, often following a sequence a capite ad calcem ("from head to heel").

=== Authors ===
The colophon of ms. Egerton 747, copied in full in the Modena manuscript, cites Diascorides (Dioscorides), Platone (Appuleius Platonicus), Galienus (Galien) and Macronem (Macer Floridus) as authors of the treatise, and mentions the name of "Bartholomeus Mini de Senis" as compiler and scribe:

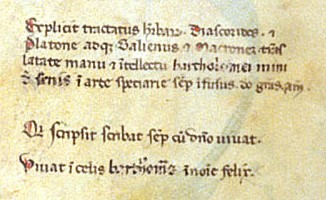
Ms. Egerton 747, f^{o} 106 r^{o}.

« Explicit tractatus h[e]rbar[um] Diascorides &

Platone adq[ue] Galienus et Macrone[m] tra[n]s

latate manu et i[n]tellectu bartholomei mini

d[e] senis i[n] arte speciare se[m]p[er] i[n]fusus d[e]o gra[tia]s am[en].

Q[u]i scripsit scribat se[m]p[er] cu[m] d[omi]no vivat.

Vivat i[n] celis bartho[lo]m[eu]s i[n] no[m]i[n]e felix.»

"Barthélémy Mini de Sienne", of whom no other work is known, has been identified as an apothecary, "versed in the art of spices". Jules Camus suggested that he was related to Andrea Mino da Siena, a 14th-century Tuscan poet of the Piccolomini family. The name Bartholomeus Mini was also found with his coat of arms on the ceiling of a salon in Siena's Museo dell'Opera Metropolitana del Duomo, dated no earlier than 1347. A Bartalomeo d'Antonio di Mino, a resident of the Terzo di Camollìa, is also mentioned several times between 1453 and 1474 in the lists of the Sienese apothecaries' guild, but this late connection is unlikely.

Otto Pächt points out, however, that the two mentions of the name in the colophon are later additions, written in a similar but different script and with darker ink. It is also unlikely that the compiler and scribe of the text were the same person, and that the latter signed twice. The abbreviation "barthoms" is used to fill a nine-character space in a formula ("Qui scripsit...") that was very common among medieval scribes. The reason for this probable usurpation remains unknown, but it is possible that Bartholomew Mini of Siena made several corrections and additions to the original text, and that he considered these modifications sufficient justification for substituting his name for those of the compiler and scribe.

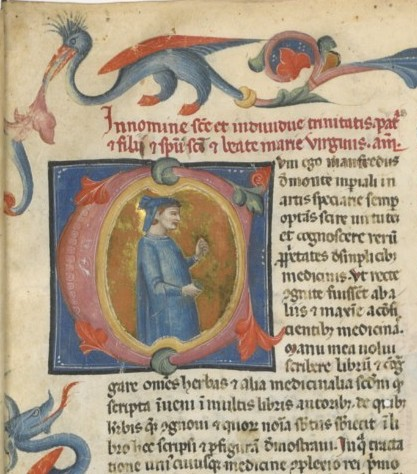
Incipit of Latin ms. 6823, fo 3 ro.

On the other hand, the attribution of the Tractatus de herbis in the Paris ms. 6823 to Manfred de Monte Imperiale is indisputable. The incipit of the treatise contains his original signature: "Cum ego, Manfredus de Monte Imperiali, in artis speciarie semper optans scire virtutes [...] in libro hoc scripsi et per figuram demonstravi." The name does not appear in any other source, however, and nothing is known of the author beyond what he himself says in this passage, i.e. that he is a medical scholar with a thorough knowledge of the existing literature on simple medicines and first-hand experience with plants and their medicinal properties. The toponym "Monte Imperiale" has been likened to Kaysersberg in Alsace, Poggibonsi (formerly Poggio Imperiale) near Sienne, or Castel del Monte in Puglia, a castle built by Emperor Federico II.

For François Avril, Manfred and Barthélémy belonged "to a still little-known milieu of herbalists in the Sienese region", while for Minta Collins, both authors worked in the South. Manfred would have commissioned Neapolitan artists to illuminate the frontispiece and incipit of his work (see below), having compiled it during his stay in Salerno. The explicit title would also indicate the author's attachment to the teachings of the famous medical school:

" Ne vero presentis operis prolixitas in immensum infundatur, haec leto fine illud concludimus. Actenus Arcanum Salerne diximus urbis littera et in lassa pollice sistat opus." "In order to prevent the prolixity of this work from becoming too long, we close it with pleasure. Thus far, we have spoken of the secrets of Salerno, and the work ends with weary handwriting and a [tired] thumb."

The reference to "the secrets of Salerno" is present in a shortened form in French in the Livre des simples médecines, and has often been used as an alternative title for the work. However, it is already present in ms. Egerton 747, as well as in several versions of Circa instans, even though they were written far from Salerno.

=== Sources ===
The chapters of Pseudo-Bartholomew Mini's Tractatus de herbis offer a pharmacological compilation typical of the field of knowledge of a mid-thirteenth-century expert in medicine and therapeutics. The author was probably not a university-educated intellectual, as the collection shows no influence of the academic sources typical of the period, such as Avicenna's Canon. Rather, it is representative of "popular" medicine, based on sources circulating in the Salernitan cultural milieu and on texts typical of late antiquity and the early Middle Ages. The compilation's methodology is relatively simple to reproduce: each alphabetical section begins with the chapters of the Circa instans, presented in the same sequence as in the original work. These are followed by additional chapters drawn from other sources, often grouped together according to their provenance. The internal structure of the chapters follows three distinct typologies:

1. Perfect reproduction, without modifications or additions, from a single source;
2. Interpolation of the content of one source within the data of another;
3. Mixed chapters", in which several sources are used to describe different properties of the substance.

==== Salerno heritage: Circa instans ====
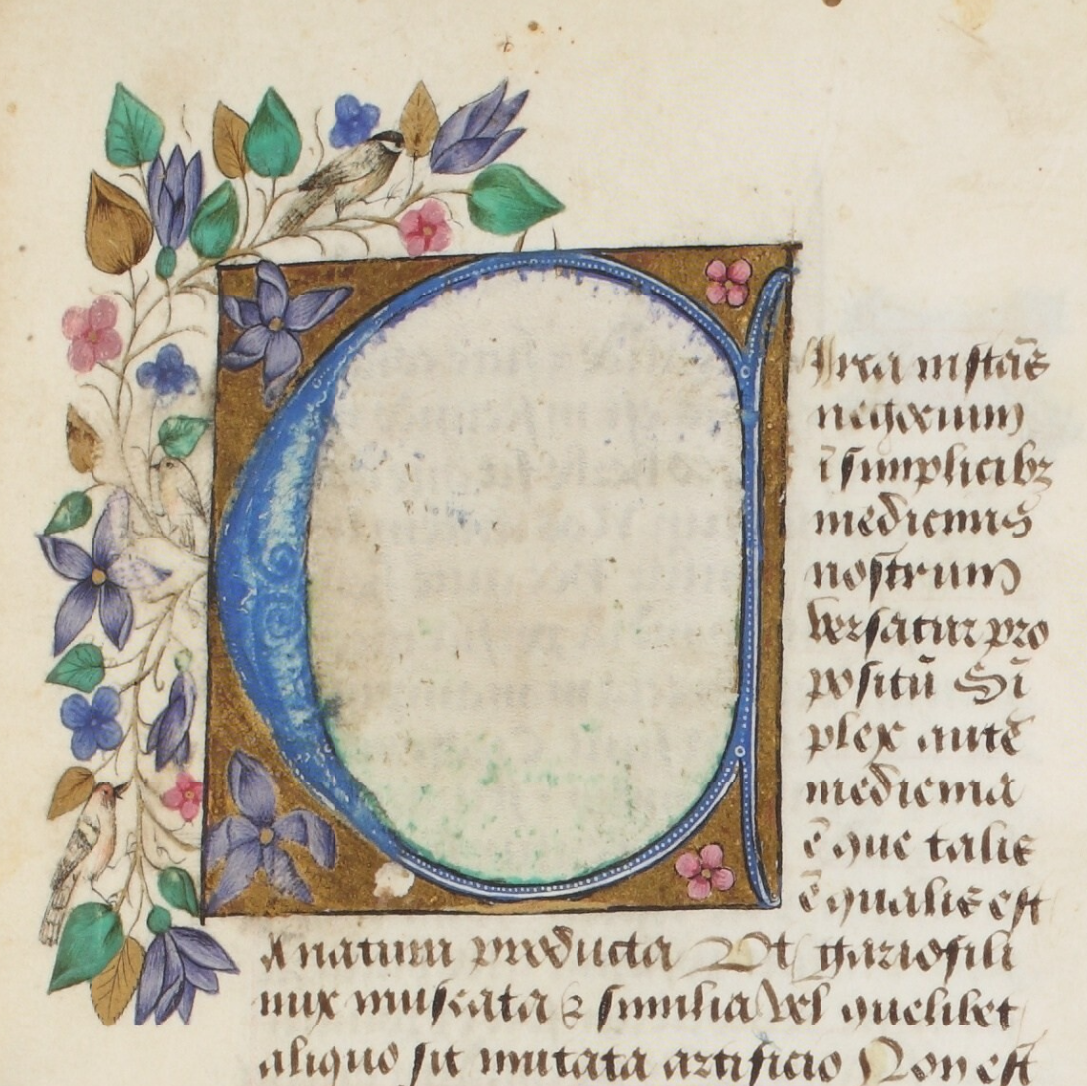
Incipit of the Tractatus de herbis, copied from Circa instans, in ms. alfa.l.09.28, fo 1 ro.

Although Platearius is not cited in the treatise's colophon, the Circa instans is the main source of the text. Compiled in the mid-11th century by a member of Salerno's medical school, the work is one of the main texts on medieval pharmacology, which was distributed throughout Europe, and of which nearly 200 manuscripts have been preserved. Its title derives from the prologue, which begins with the phrase "Circa instans negotium in simplicibus medicinis". The traditional attribution to Matthew Platearius, a semi-legendary figure, has now been refuted by most scholars. The question of the sources of Circa instans is made particularly difficult by the almost total absence of references or mentions of the authors consulted. Nevertheless, the treatise is certainly based on the pharmacopoeia of Constantine the African, derived from his Latin translations of Arabic medical texts. The prologue and all the chapters of the Circa instans are included in the Tractatus de herbis, which differentiates it from the other sources of the treatise, which appear only as extracts. It also dictates the overall structure of the compilation, and transfers to it the essence of the Salernitan therapeutic tradition. Other texts typical of the school's pharmacopoeia are conspicuous by their absence: barely a handful of chapters can be compared with the antidotaries of the Liber iste and Antidotarium Nicolai, or with the glossary of the Alphita, but these are only vague reminiscences that could very well have come from glosses in other sources.

Among the numerous redactions of the Circa instans, the one contained in ms. 674 of the Erlangen (Note: The text of the manuscript was published in a German critical edition in 1939.) university library, with 252 entries, is the one that bears the closest resemblance to the Pseudo-Barthélémy Mini text. The latter was probably written later, as shown by the inclusion under the initial S of several additional chapters placed at the end of the treatise in the Erlangen codex. The manuscript is not precisely dated, but it postdates other versions of Platearius' text produced in the first half of the thirteenth century, providing a terminus post quem to the compilation of the Tractatus. The similarities and differences between the Erlangen and London manuscripts suggest the existence of an intermediate edition between the two works. Several chapters are taken from Constantine the African's Liber de gradibus, and it is possible that the anonymous compiler of the Tractatus, rather than having extracted them on his initiative, simply copied them from an amplified version of the Circa instans, now lost.

==== Alto-medieval tradition: Pseudo-Apulée ====
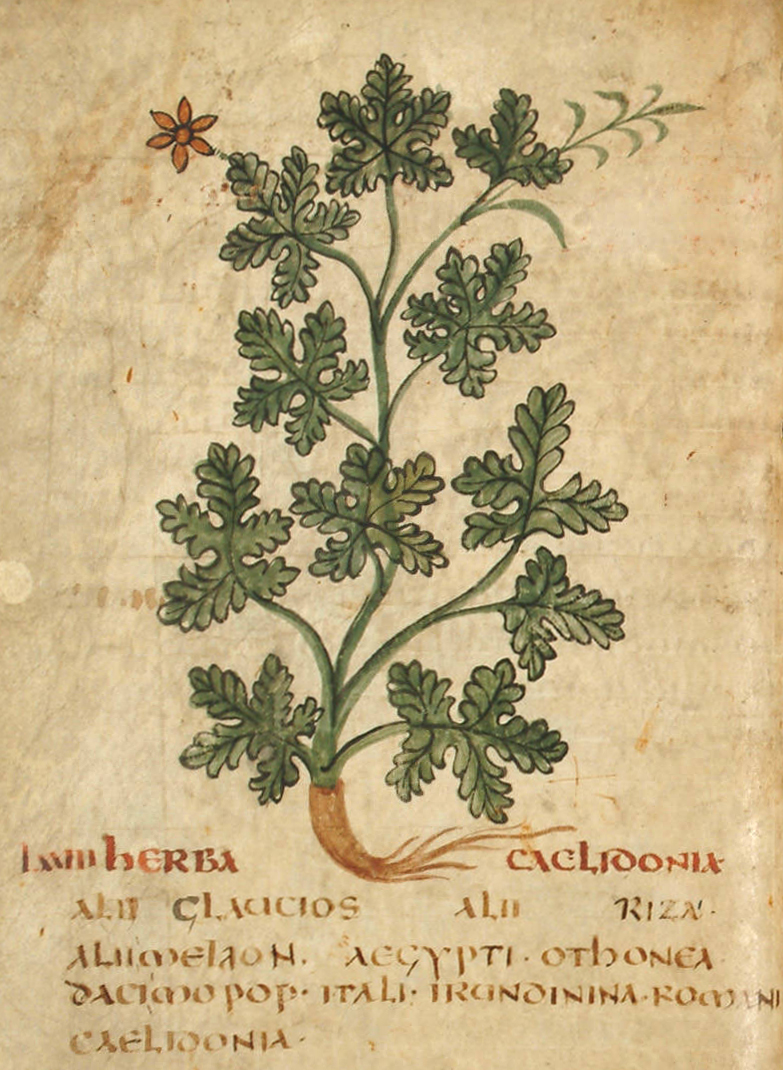
Herba celidonia (large chelidonia) in a life-time version of the Pseudo-Apulée herbarium.

The second main source of the Tractatus is the Herbarius of "Pseudo-Apulée", a herbarium compiled in Latin in the 4th century and artificially attributed to Apulée of Madaure. Based on Greek and Latin sources, in particular Pliny the Elder and Pliny's Medicine, the Herbarius comprises 131 illustrated chapters, each devoted to a distinct plant. It exists in two different versions and has been preserved in numerous manuscripts, often accompanied by other short texts from late antiquity, such as the anonymous Liber de taxone, the Liber medicinae ex animalibus by Sextus Placitus, the Ex herbis femininis by Pseudo-Dioscorides or the Liber de herba vettonica, wrongly attributed to Antonius Musa to increase its authority. The latter is entirely devoted to the therapeutic properties of Betony, and serves as a partial source for the "De bectonica" chapter of the Tractatus dedicated to this plant. These compendia were immensely popular between the life and the tenth century, thanks to their conciseness, simple, accessible structure and easy-to-understand form, devoid of excessive technical terms. The subsequent distribution of the Herbarius is less well documented: it is likely that by the thirteenth century, the treatise was no longer part of the reference texts, but rather part of the baggage of sources that dominated popular medicine.

In the Tractatus de herbis, 49 chapters are copied directly from the work of the Pseudo-Apuleius, and in a further 32 cases, extracts are used to interpolate the contents of the Circa instans. The Alto-medieval herbarium is not, however, evenly represented: its last thirty chapters are virtually absent from the compilation, which might suggest that the copy used was not complete. It's also interesting to note that in the case of extrapolations, only the list of synonyms for the substance is included. This is a strange lexicographical approach, as most of these names were no longer in use at the time the Tractatus was compiled, and is perhaps explained by the fascination they still exerted in popular culture. By inserting these synonyms, the author would have chosen to provide accessory elements of no practical use, presented as precious and exotic rarities.

==== Dietary supplements: Isaac Israeli ====
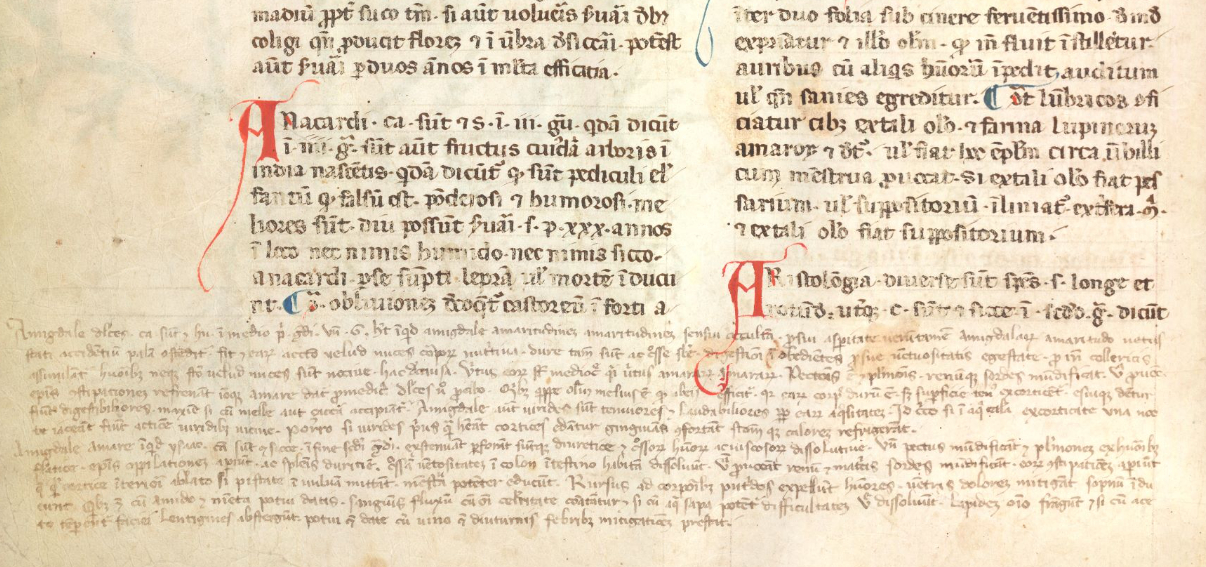
The chapter on sweet almonds, taken from Isaac Israeli, is integrated into the lower margin of fo 6 vo of ms. Egerton 747.

The last important source of the Tractatus de herbis has no connection with medicine and pharmacology: it is the De diaetis particularibus, a Galenic-inspired treatise on nutrition and dietetics. Written in Kairouan in the 10th century by the Jewish physician and philosopher Isaac Israeli, the work was translated into Latin by Constantine the African and forms part of the typical corpus of medical texts of the Salerno school. While the Tractatus de herbis is not the first amplified version of the Circa instans to include extracts from Isaac's work, the modality of these extrapolations is very specific: they are mostly written in a smaller script inserted in the empty spaces of the columns or in the margins. Although in the same hand as the main text, these extracts are undoubtedly later additions. They sometimes simply enrich the information on a substance taken from another source, but in some cases they also form separate entries, absent from the alphabetical summaries. In all, De diaetis particularibus represents the source of 60 chapters scattered throughout the treatise. Their particular form could be proof that the London manuscript is not a copy but an original arrangement. Later versions of the Tractatus de herbis integrate the dietetic chapters into the body of the text and cite them in the summaries opening each alphabetical section, which could indicate that they are directly derived from ms. Egerton 747.

=== Other sources ===
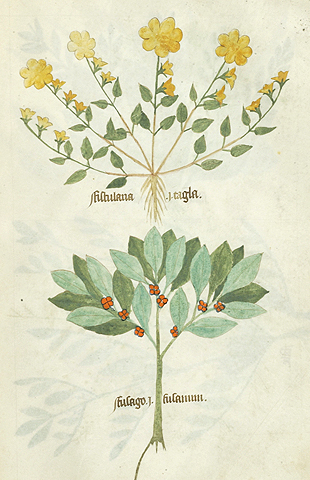
Helianthemum and charcoal in ms. M. 873 New York, fo 45 ro. No source prior to the Tractatus mentions these plants.

Compared with the massive use of the Circa instans and the Herbarius, and the special place of the De diaetis, the role of other sources is rather limited. Only three chapters (Note: These are the chapters "De atriplex", "De herpillos" and "De urtica".) are taken from Macer Floridus's De viribus herbarum, a botanical poem composed in France at the end of the eleventh century. It is, however, used on numerous occasions, not as a reference text, but to introduce specific information into the text of another source. Macer Floridus is also the only source in the Tractatus that is systematically cited as such: passages copied from De viribus herbarum are thus introduced by phrases such as "Et etiam dicit Macro, quod multas habet virtutes, [...]" ("And Macer, who has many virtues, says [...]").

The anonymous compiler of the Tractatus still alludes to the authority of Dioscorides, and it is clear that many passages in the text are taken from De materia medica. The question of which of the many forms, direct and indirect, in which the ancient text circulated in the 13th century, was used remains unresolved. Nevertheless, several chapters bear similarities to the text of the alphabetical Latin Dioscorides of the xieme century, which is the alphabetical rearrangement of the Latin translation of the xieme century, enriched by several additions.

Finally, of the more than 500 chapters in the treatise, around a hundred have no identified sources. For the most part, they are grouped together at the end of each alphabetical section, which may reflect the compiler's desire to separate them from the other chapters. Some may have been extracted from appendices to other texts, of which we have lost track. The chapter "De hecino", for example, bears some resemblance to a text appended to a Florentine codex that also includes a Pseudo-Apuleius and a Pseudo-Dioscorides. But many other chapters have a very particular form that leads to another explanation: they are written in a less rigid style and in a language showing significant Romanesque influences; they also contain a description of the plant that always corresponds perfectly to that of the illustration. It has therefore been hypothesized that they derive not from written sources, but from oral tradition. If this is the case, the Tractatus de herbis should be redefined not as a scholarly compilation, but as a vade mecum combining data from medical manuals with pharmaco-botanical practice.

==== Further amplifications ====
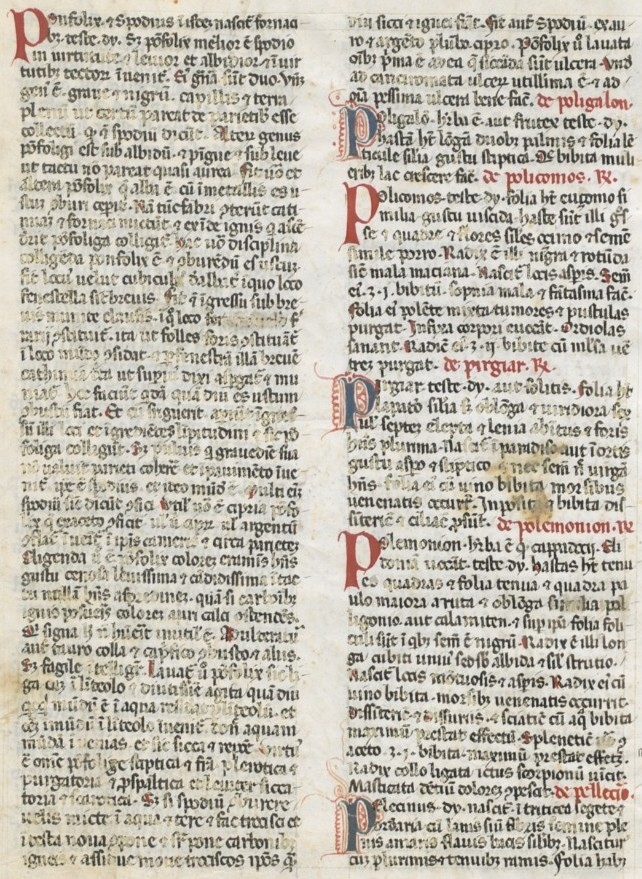
Ms. Latin 6823, fo 130 vo: typical series of chapters without illustrations at the end of the initial P.

The original text of the Tractatus de herbis, that of ms. Egerton 747 or an earlier version no longer extant, has been the subject of two successive amplifications that form distinct redactions including other sources. Manfred de Monte Imperiale's version makes more extensive and detailed use of the pharmaco-botanical literature available at the end of the thirteenth century: the author includes Arabic medical science, represented by Avicenna's Canon and the Liber aggregatus in medicinis simplicibus by Pseudo-Serapion. He also makes use of Simon of Genoa's Clavis sanationis, a dictionary of Latin, Greek and Arabic medical terminology. Finally, Manfred reappropriates Dioscorides' medical material, using a version that does not fully correspond to the alphabetical Latin Dioscorides. The extracts attributable to the physician of Anazarb are much more numerous and developed than in the version of ms. Egerton 747, and are systematically substituted for those of the Pseudo-Apuleius. The chapters based on Isaac Israeli's De diaetis are perfectly inserted into the body of the text and often accompanied by an illustration, which was lacking in the London manuscript. The management of images is not homogeneous: most alphabetical sections open with entries already present in the Pseudo-Barthélémy Mini version and are accompanied by illustrations inspired by them. Added to this central core is a series of images unique to Manfred's version, whose model has not been determined. Finally, the sections end with unillustrated chapters dedicated to mineral and animal substances, or little-known plants cited by Dioscorides or Avicenna. Manfred's superior erudition is finally perceptible in the treatment of several entries originally based on oral tradition: the author retains the substance's common name, but replaces the chapter's content with written sources, mainly from the work of Dioscoride. (Note: An example of this process can be seen in the chapter "De ambroxiana", whose content Manfred replaces with an extract from Dioscorides dedicated to ambrosia (a name directly transliterated from the Greek αμβροσία).) He thus proceeds, in a method that might be described as "pre-scientific", to identify certain plant species mentioned in ancient sources, and offers their authority a kind of "actualization".

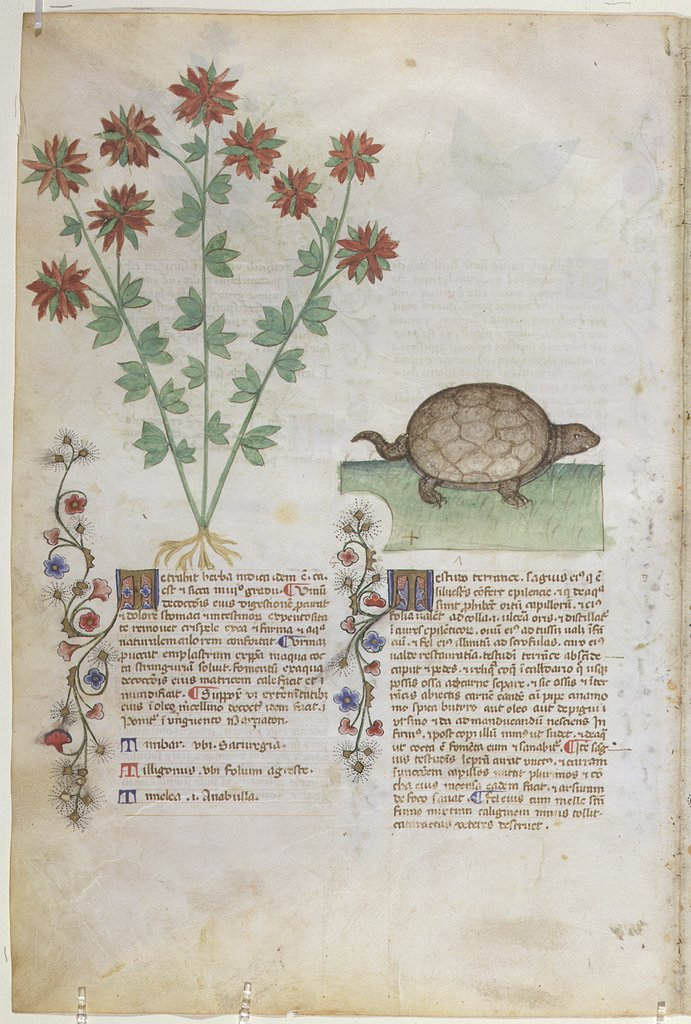
Ms. 459, fo 264 vo: Tetrahit and Testudo (tortoise).

More than a century later, Manfred's Tractatus de herbis can be found in the Visconti library in Milan. The earliest catalog of this collection, entitled Consignatio librorum and dated 1426, actually indicates the presence of two copies of the text: the one now preserved in ms. Latin 6823 in Paris (catalog entry no. 923) and a second, now lost (no. 492). He also mentions two Circa instans (nos. 458 and 768), an alphabetical Dioscorides (no. 780), several volumes of Avicenna's Canon (nos. 481, 487, 489, 491, 801 and 802) and Isaac Israeli's De diaetis particularibus (no. 431). A few decades earlier, the anonymous author of the Historia plantarum certainly had access to this rich library to produce the most imposing version of the cycle. He used the structure established by the Tractatus to complete a compilation of over 900 chapters based on the same sources as those used by Manfred, but exploited in a broader way. The author has also reorganized the chapters, abandoning the "block" arrangement of each initial in favor of strict alphabetical order. A notable exception is the chapter dedicated to gold, "Aurum", which should logically have closed the section with the initial A, but is kept in first position below the frontispiece. This choice betrays a tendency to seek prestige on the part of a compiler who also made a selection among the entries in the Parisian version to retain only "noble" substances (perfumes, spices, exotic plants and fruits), as well as those that could be easily illustrated. Chapters on the nature of animals are also included in the midst of those dealing with simples (see below). They are taken from the Liber medicinae ex animalibus by Sextus Placitus, but also from the Cyranides, a collection of late antique hermetic works. This singular combination of pharmacopoeia, dietetics and magic is indicative of the nature of the Historia plantarum: the work was probably not a medical-botanical encyclopedia, but rather a work intended for a courtly audience curious about the wonders of the natural world.

=== Language ===
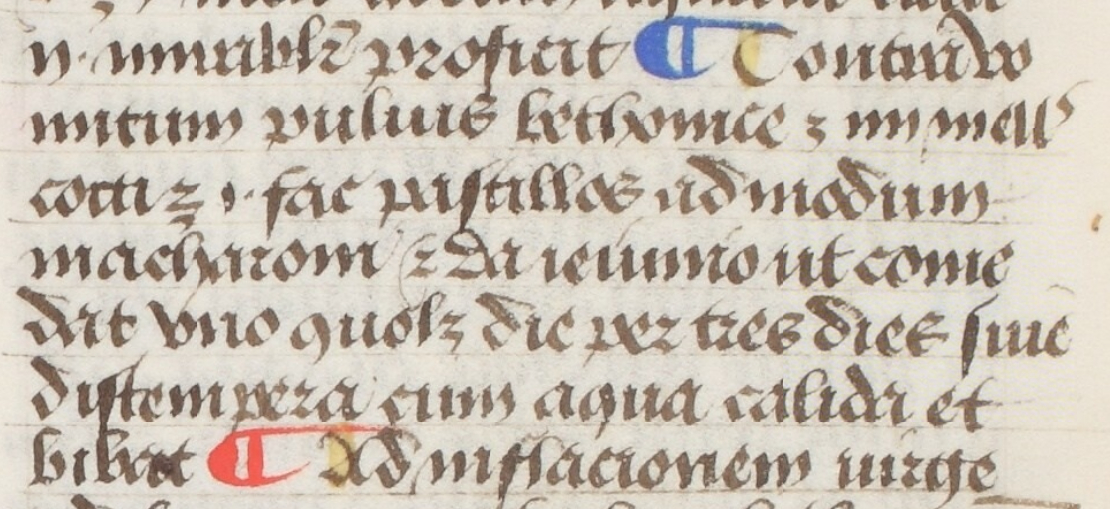
Ms. alfa.l.09.28, fo 23 vo: in this extract from the De bectonica chapter, the presence of the word macharoni ("macaroni") in the fourth line bears witness to the influence of vernacular languages on the Latin text.

Due to its composite nature, the Tractatus de herbis exhibits considerable linguistic variability: the various sources used to compile it are integrated into it while respecting both the content and the form of their original texts. The language used in the treatise thus varies substantially from chapter to chapter, depending on whether they are taken from the Circa instans (written in simple but correct Latin), the Herbarius (a work that testifies to a phase of decline in classical Latin) or other sources. The sections that probably originated in oral tradition (see above), on the other hand, are deeply influenced by the vulgar language and perhaps even Italian. It is also remarkable that the copyist of ms. Egerton 747, who was not the compiler of the text, had only a very partial understanding of what he was writing, as evidenced by the very many errors present throughout the treatise. These are particularly glaring in the poor transcription of scientific abbreviations, which should have been familiar to any medical experte. (Note: For example, in the chapter De acoro, the abbreviation of the term frigiditate ("coldness") is transcribed by the term fraternitate ("brotherhood"), which betrays a habit of copying texts of a religious nature.) This tendency reaches a climax in the extracts from De diaetis, where the scribe seems to understand neither the technical vocabulary nor even the logical meaning of the sentences.

On the phonetic level, the language used to write the treatise does not show all the features that usually characterize medieval Latin. While the classical diphthongs ' ae ' and ' oe ' are systematically changed to ' e ', the transformation of the ' ti ' group into ' ci ' (e.g. vitium, "the defect", into vicium), though typical of the medieval language, is not applied. For other phenomena, the text shows a certain graphic uncertainty, with two different forms sometimes coexisting for the same terms. This is the case for the oppositions ' ph ' / ' f ' (morphea and morfea, "the morphea"), ' x ' / ' s ' (axungia and asungia, "the axonge") or ' l ' / ' r ' (clister and crister, "the clyster"). This variability is particularly marked for technical terms, such as the names of diseases, plants or medical instruments: icterus is thus attested in the forms ictericia, yctericia and hictericia, and epilepsy is noted as epilentia, epilensia or epiletsia.

As far as morphology and syntax are concerned, the language in which the treatise was written is marked above all by the disappearance of the Latin grammatical case system. This can be seen in the loss of sensitivity to the function of the accusative (purgandi colera instead of purgandi coleram) and in the lack of concordance between prepositions and the cases that normally accompany them in the classical language. In chapter headings, for example, the preposition de ("about") is followed by the nominative rather than the ablative. The same applies to the prepositions contra ("against"), super ("on"), circa ("around") or propter ("near"), normally governed by the accusative. Another feature of the transition to Romance languages is the transformation of genders and the partial disappearance of the neuter. As in other contemporary texts, the neuter is often replaced by the feminine: for example, the neuter plural menstrua, "menstruation", becomes the feminine singular menstruam. The phenomenon can also be seen in the lack of concordance between noun and adjective (e.g. vinum [neuter] bibitus [masculine]), or in the indistinct use of gendered forms (qui, quae, quod) of the relative pronoun "que".

== Iconography ==
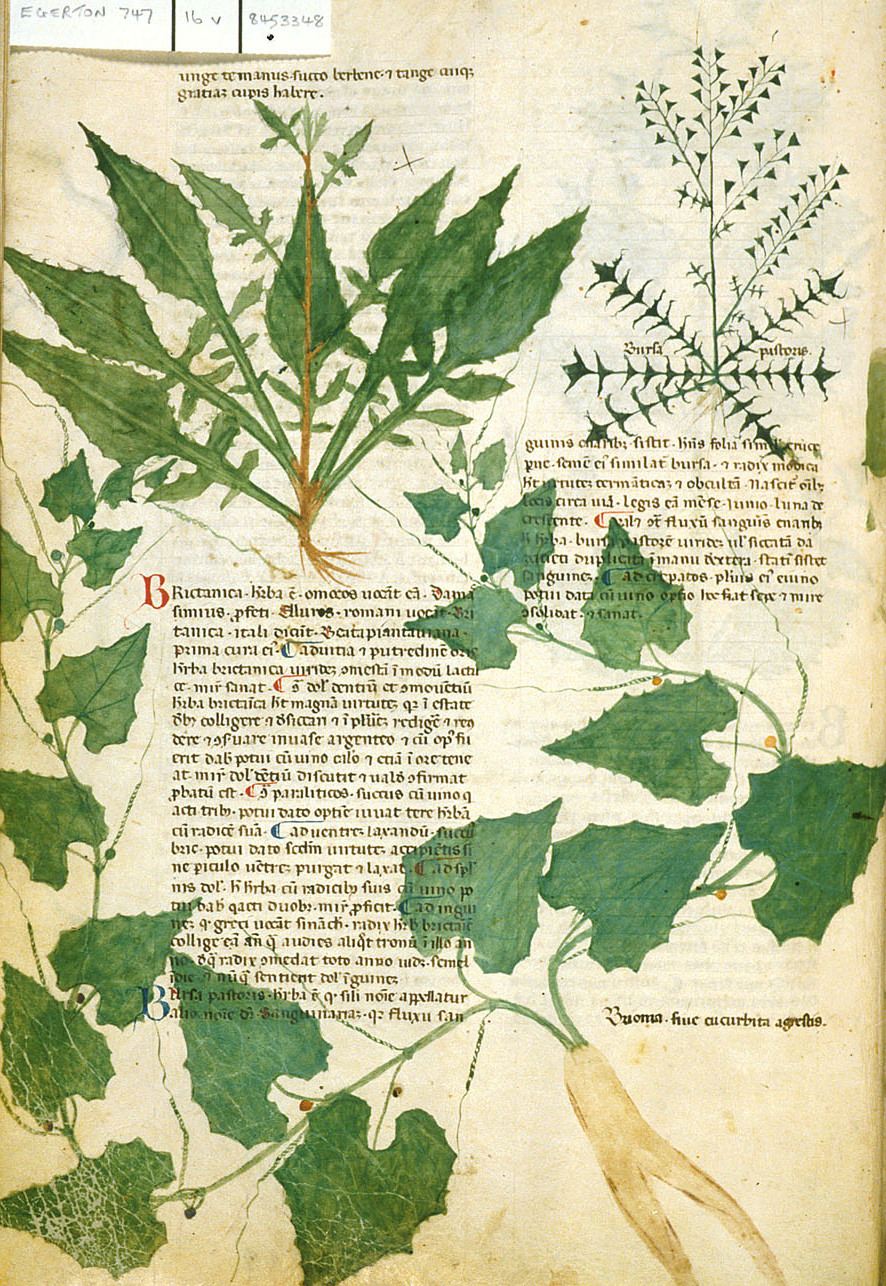
Example of the variety of techniques used for plant illustrations in ms. Egerton 747 (fo 16 vo).

The iconographic tradition of the Tractatus de herbis, which probably originated in ms. Egerton 747, represents an important innovation in medieval illustration. For the first time since the end of Antiquity, it reproduces botanical images rich in naturalistic observations. For Otto Pächt, this new tradition was not the result of a change in aesthetic credo, but rather was driven from outside the realm of art: it was the growing development of empirical science that adopted pictorial representation as a means of teaching.

=== Plants ===
The Egerton ms. 747 contains 406 illustrations of plants, which Pächt has described as "half-image, half-diagram ". There is no attempt at shading or modeling, and plants are represented schematically and strictly two-dimensionally. In a few rare cases, leaves, stems or branches overlap, intertwine or curve to show the plant's growth profile. However, the details of the leaves and flowers, and their arrangement on the stem, are depicted with sufficient accuracy that the plant can, in the majority of cases, be identified from the illustration alone. A number of techniques have been employed to provide pleasing and varied images and to accentuate the character of different species. This effect is created by the broad spectrum of green hues, as well as by the use of lighter and darker shades to represent leaf veins.

At least three stylistic groups of plants can be distinguished. Trees and shrubs from overseas or "the Indies", such as the incense tree (fig. A, bottom right), whose products reached Europe in dried form, are illustrated with images that bear no resemblance to their natural appearance. They are characterized by clean, fine lines and careful application of paint, and are well framed in the space of the column reserved for them. (Note: See also the chapters De anacardis, De cubebe, De emblici or De sebesten.) Familiar trees such as the fig tree (fig. B, right), with their more recognizable leaf shapes, are marked by a freer, bolder use of paint, and a more sketchy, less delicate style. (Note: See also the chapters De pomo citrino and De persiche.) Finally, common aromatic herbs such as coriander or chervil (fig. C) are depicted in a more precise, smaller and more schematic way. (Note: See also the chapters De ocimo, De origano or De petroselino.) These groups suggest that the artists worked from sets of drawings, some invented for unknown plants, others composed of characteristic features but without proportion, and still others drawn from nature.

With regard to this third group, Felix Baumann suspects that the often two-dimensional representations of plants are based on pressed originals. The leaves of wild chicory (fig. D, left), which are naturally arranged in a rosette around the stem, are thus represented in a star shape as if they were a flattened specimen. However, the first evidence of the herbarium technique, collections of dried plants, is only known from the 16th century onwards, and if true, this hypothesis would bring the discovery forward by almost two centuries. The thesis is also of decisive importance for the question of the relationship between art and nature in the thirteenth and fourteenth centuries, as it suggests a new form of knowledge production that focuses on the relationship between experimentation and the artist's experience beyond the copying of pictorial models. The Tractatus de herbis could thus be an unprecedented example of a painted hortus siccus, transferring into images the practices of collecting, pressing, preserving and classifying plants.

Examples of simple illustrations in ms. Egerton 747.

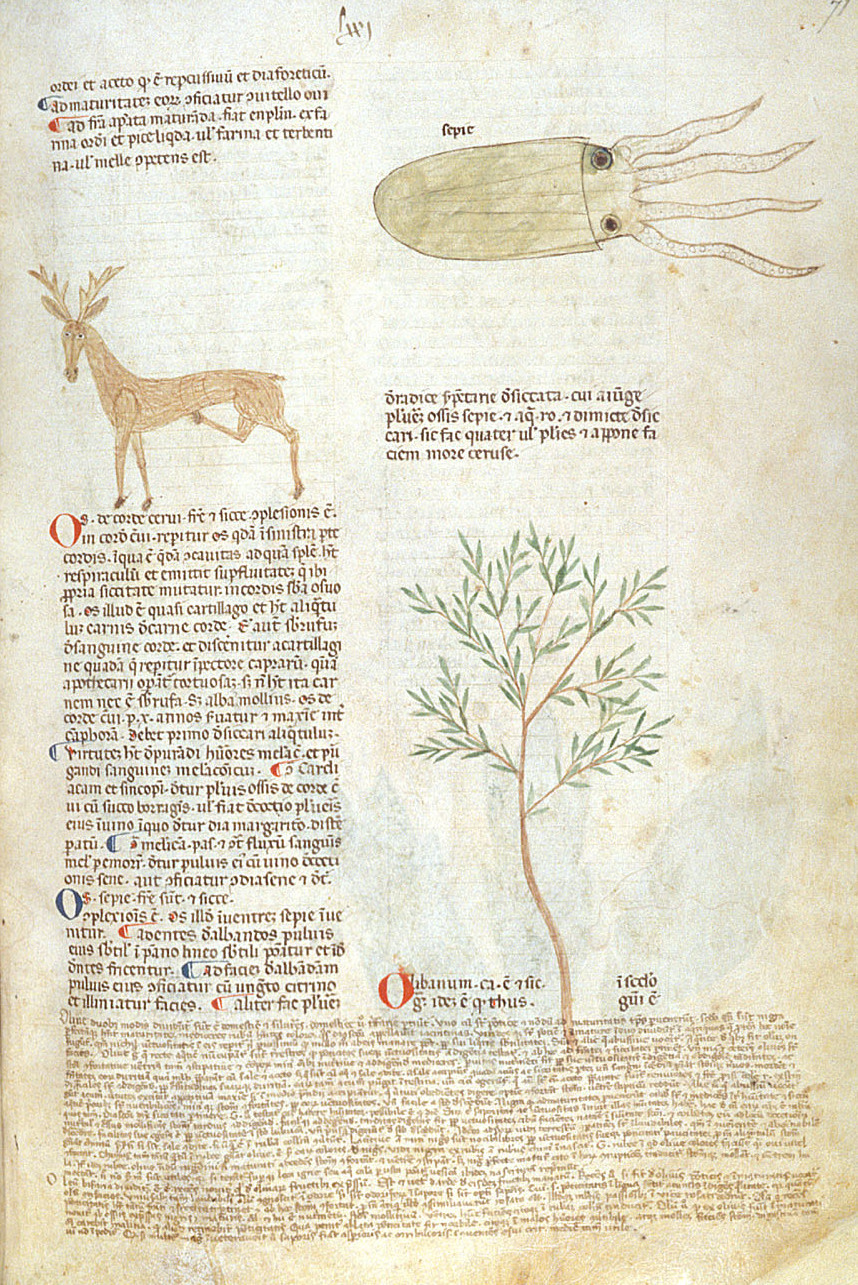
A. De ossis de corde cervi, De ossis sepie, De olibano (f^{o} 71 r^{o}).

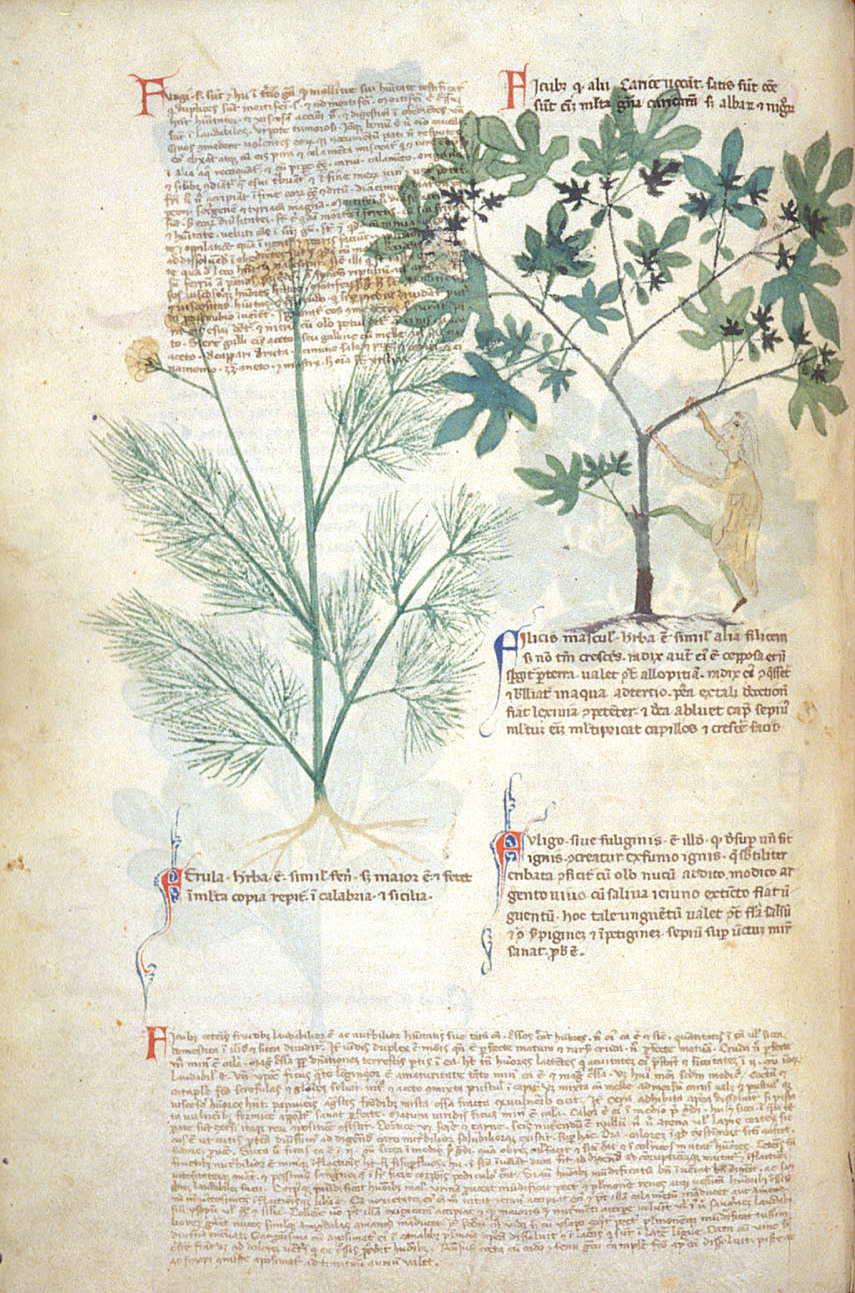
B. De ferula, De ficubus (f^{o} 41 v^{o}).

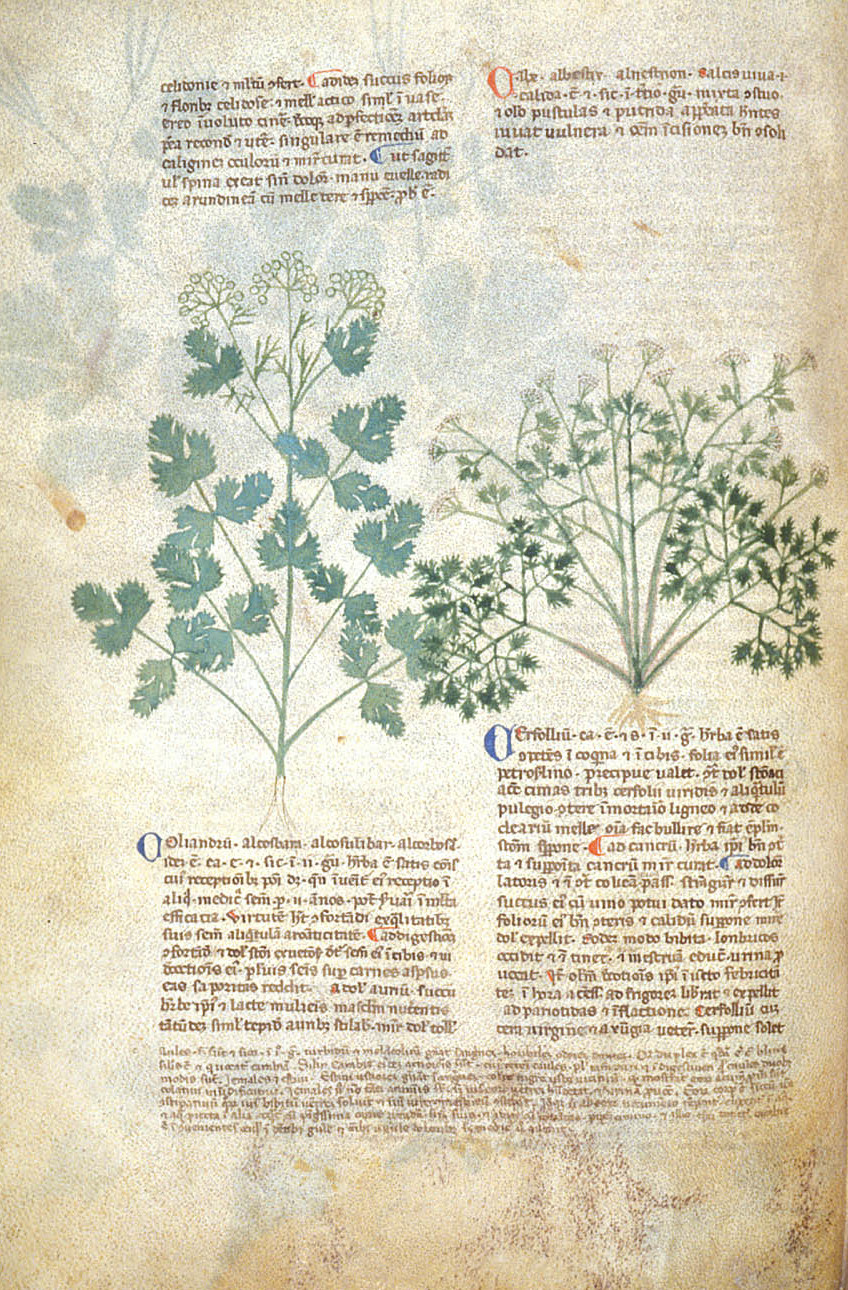
C. De coliandro, De cerfollio (f^{o} 27 v^{o}).

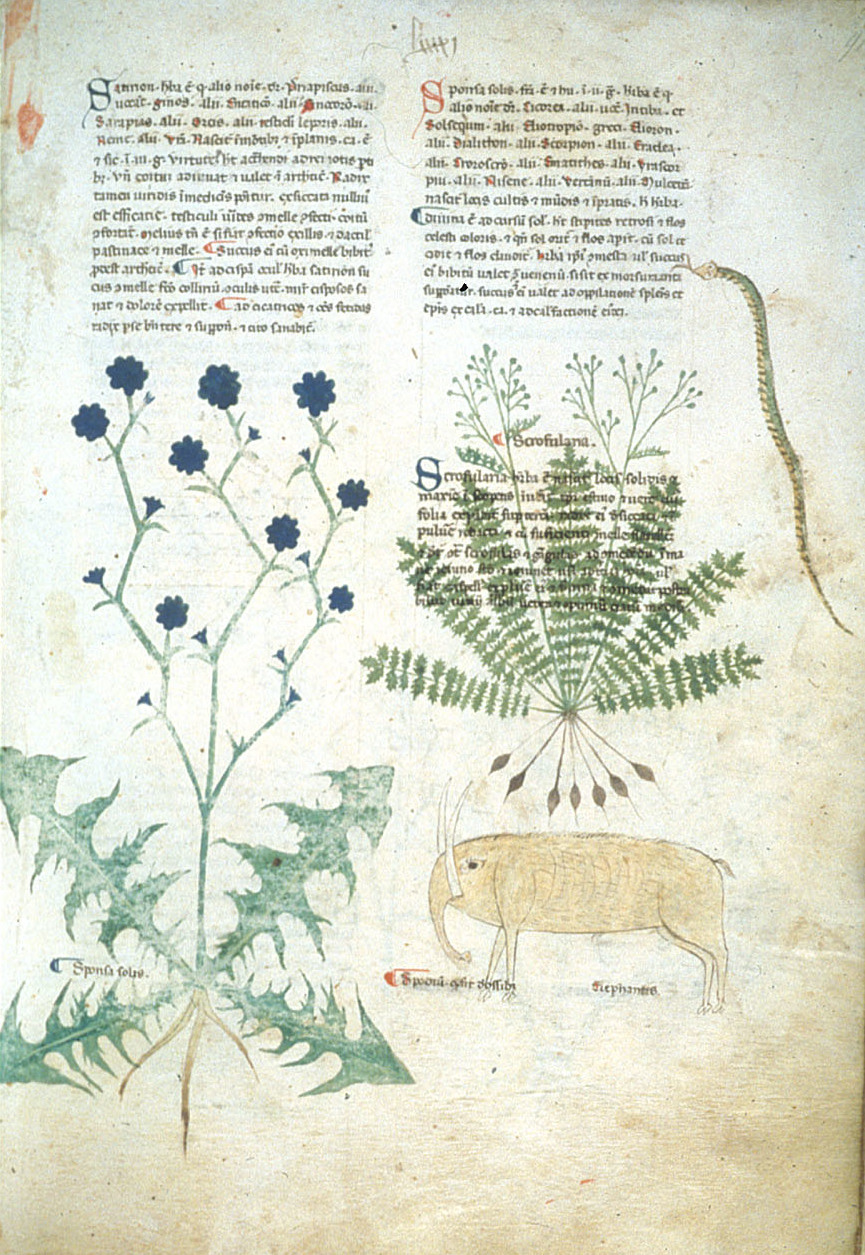
D. De sponsa solis, De scrofularia, De spondio (f^{o} 91 r^{o}).

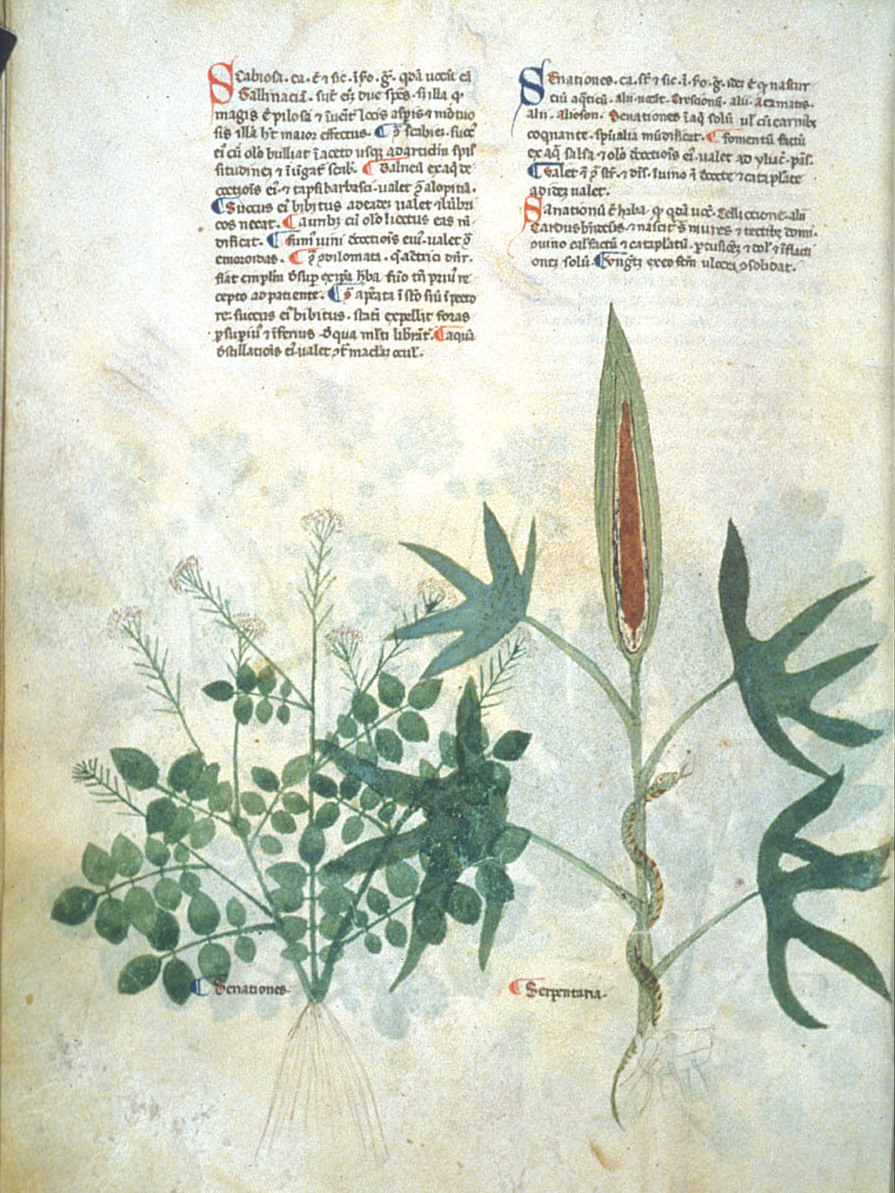
E. De senationes, De serpentaria (f^{o} 93 v^{o}).

In Latin ms. 6823, Manfred de Monte Imperiale draws largely on the illustrative corpus of the London manuscript, but manages to push the naturalistic rendering of images even further. For example, the layout of the folio devoted to officinal cress and serpentaria (fig. E and F) is very similar in the two codices, but in Manfred's version, the serpentaria is depicted with the spathe and leaves in profile, showing a prominence over the cress in proportion to the nature of the two plants. The schematic and frontal models of ms. Egerton 747 are thus adapted to show the leaves from different angles. The flowers and their different colors are also rendered with greater precision, and the relative size of the species is better rendered. Depending on whether the leaf is viewed from the front or the back, the veins appear as if sunken inwards or curved outwards, creating a strong haptic effect.

The work of the artists of the various Tractatus de herbis, is not necessarily objective. In the case of exotic plants, the illuminator has no choice but to use his imagination based on textual clues. Manfred's version includes one of the earliest representations of a banana tree in the West (fig. G, left). To accompany the chapter dedicated to the "Tree of Paradise", which is devoid of illustration in ms. Egerton 747, the painter followed the indications given by the text: the plant is described with leaves resembling those of the greater elecampane, but longer and broader, with long, thick branches and lemon-like fruits, whose sweet taste appeals to the gallbladder. The image is thus based on that of the elecampane (fig. H, left), but shows leaves enlarged by about a third and stems bearing yellowish, oval-shaped fruits. The latter are more reminiscent of melon or pumpkin than lemon, perhaps in an attempt to accentuate their sweetness87.

Examples of simple illustrations in Latin ms. 6823.

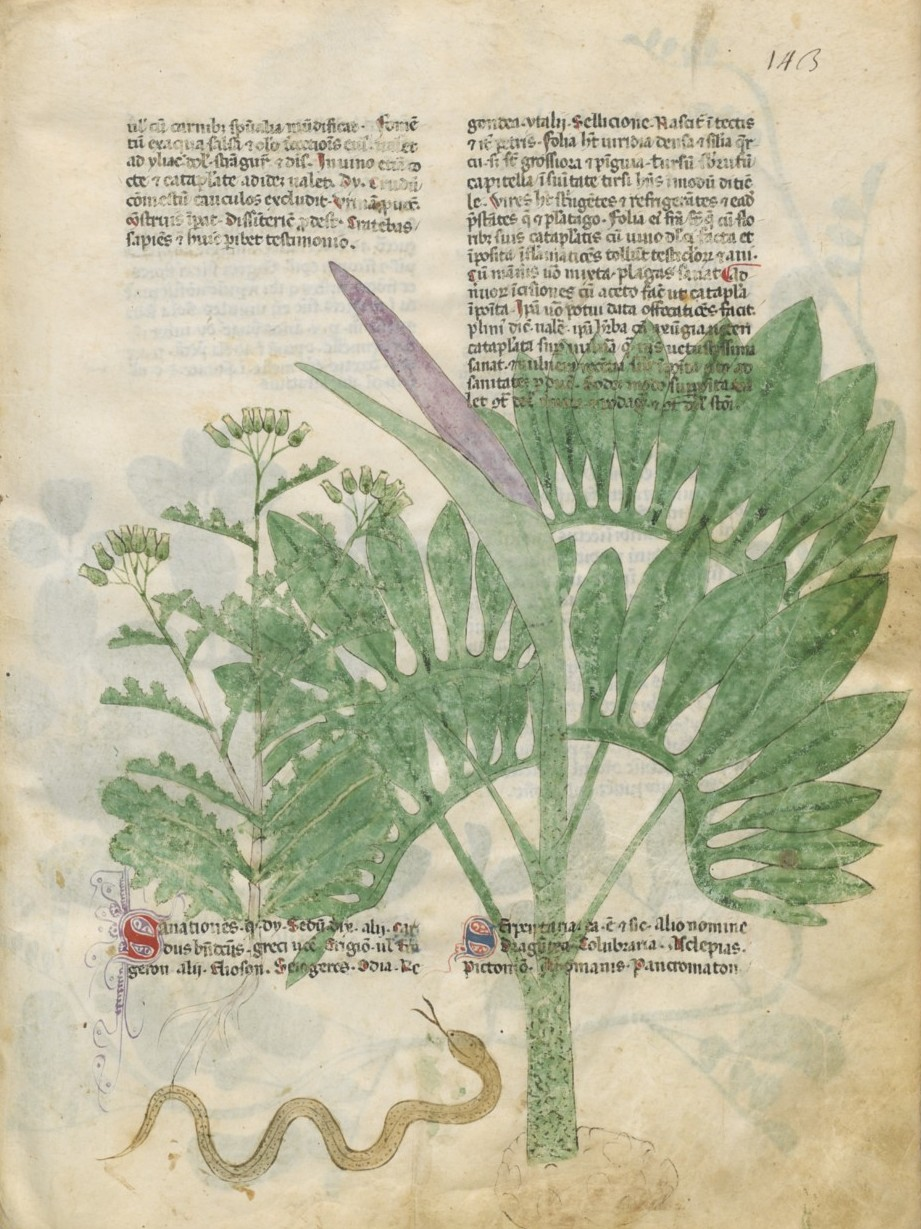
F. De senationes, De serpentaria (f^{o} 143 r^{o}).

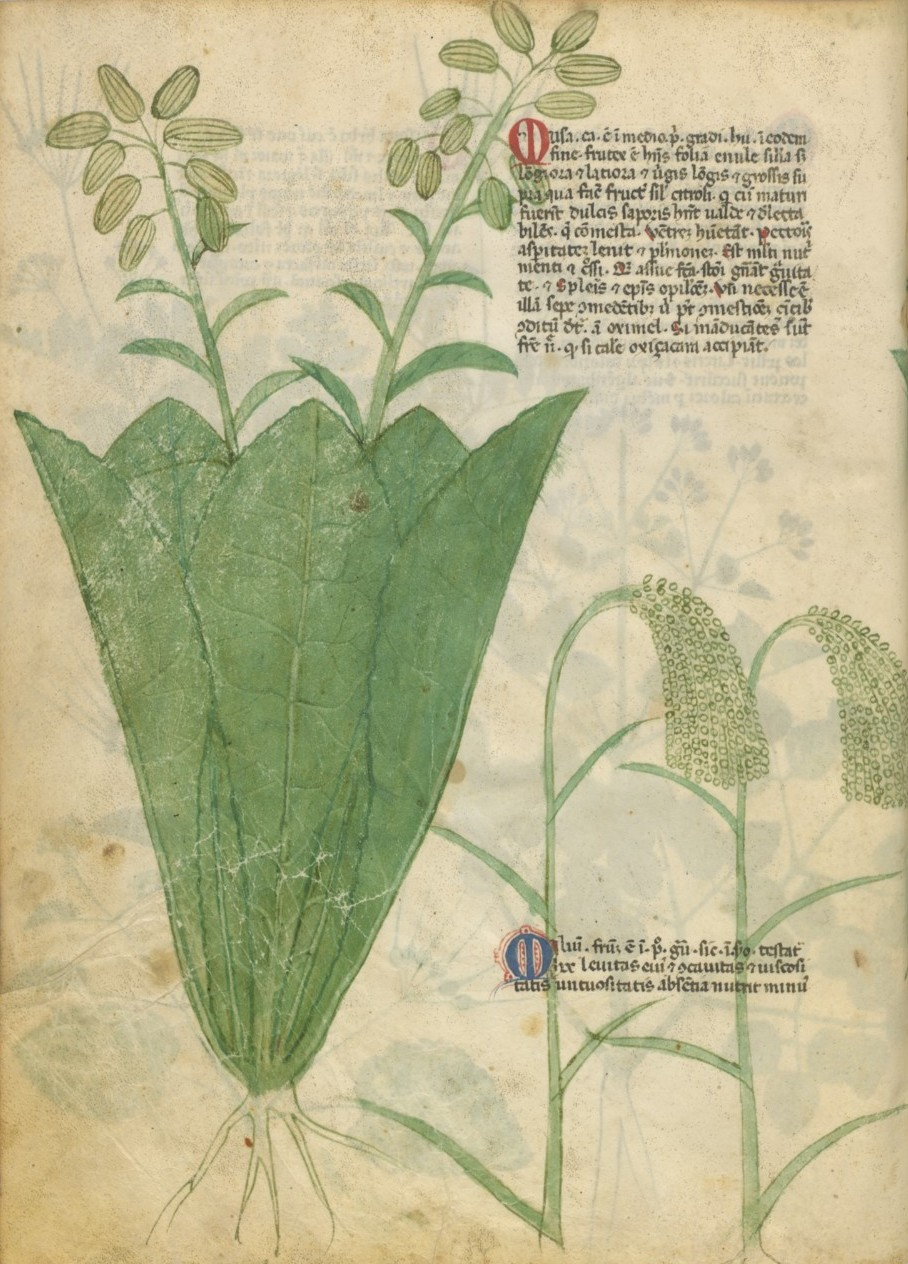
G. De musa, De milio (f^{o} 105 v^{o}).

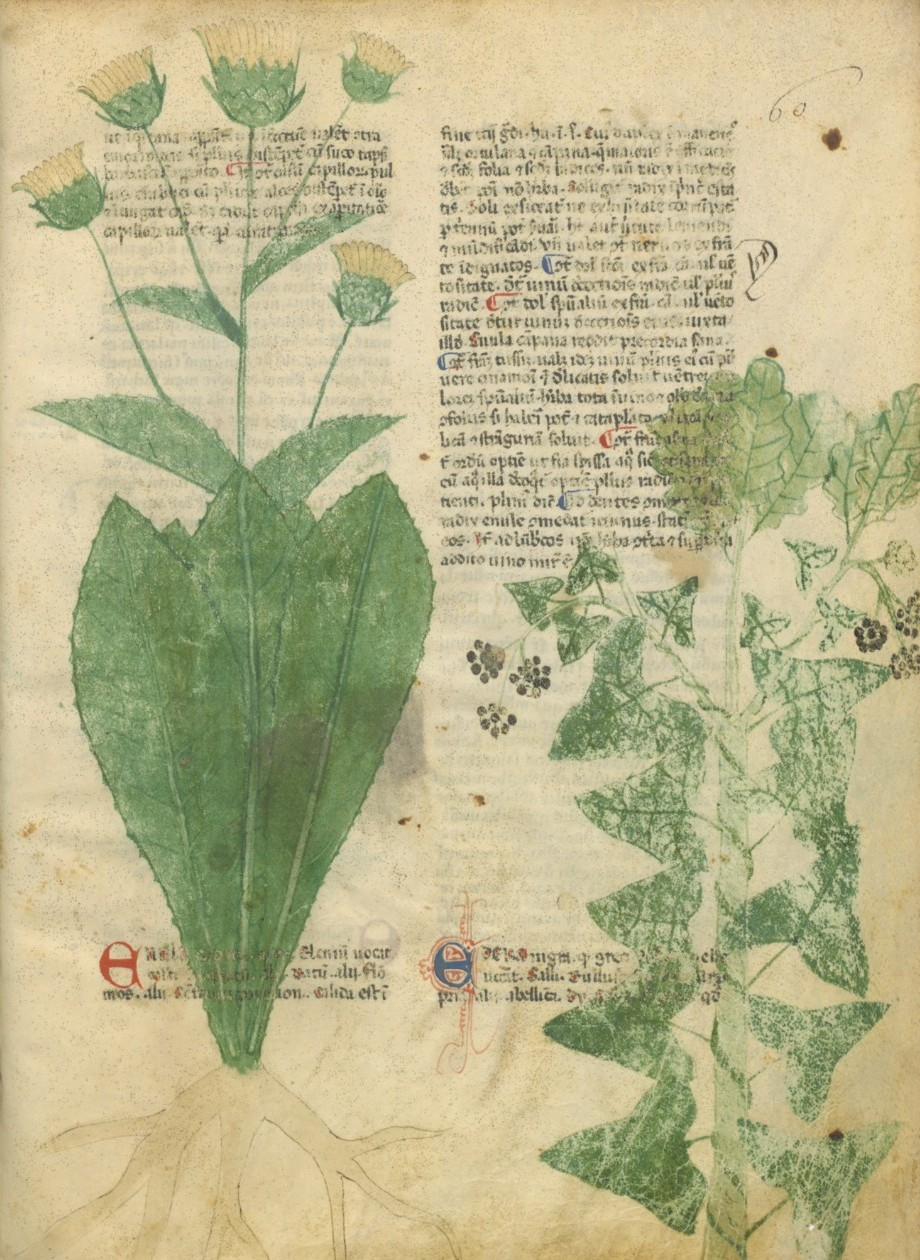
H. De enula, De edera nigra (f^{o} 60 r^{o}).

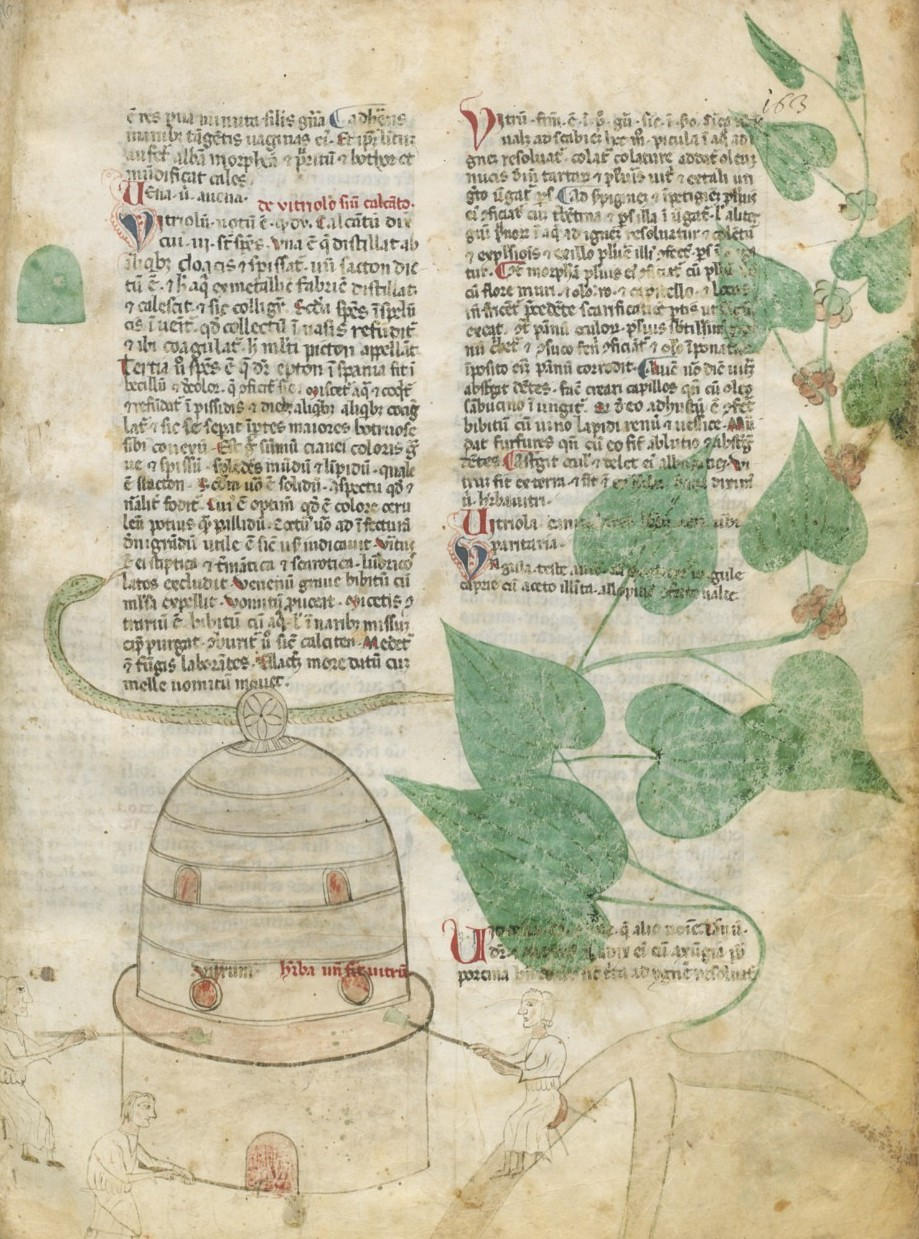
J. De vitriolo, De vitro, De viticella (f^{o} 163 r^{o}).

The links between text and images are manifold, going beyond the mere explanation of botanical characteristics. At the same time, the interactions between the images themselves, although a priori dictated by alphabetical order, are also numerous. An interesting example of this phenomenon is provided by folio 163 ro of Latin ms. 6823, which presents vitriol, glass and viticella, the common sieve (fig. J). The plant's leaves, which are much larger in the lower part, taper upwards to reveal berries that are first red, then green in the upper part of the tendril. This illustration shows the whole process of growth and maturation of this climbing plant, whose main feature remains an oversized root divided into three branches. On one of these, a man is seated on a stool with a glassmaker's cane in his hand. He is part of the adjacent scene illustrating glassmaking in a furnace. Above him, a snake points to the sentence in the text indicating the poisonous nature of vitriol (see below). It forms both a side branch of the sieve and a rope from which the bell-shaped furnace hangs. This visual interplay creates new networks of relationships between the singles, dissolving dimensional relations and suggesting to the viewer that there is a possible link between them. This is established in the text by several indications: firstly, the recurring motif of the element fire as a means of transformation, which acts as a tertium comparationis of the three substances. The recipe for one remedy, for example, calls for the grated root to be burned with lard. Glass is also described as having a dual origin: from earth and a plant. One variety of vitriol, produced in Spain, is obtained by coagulation and separates into grape-like pieces. The immature berries of the Tamier tree are the same pale green as vitriol and glass samples from the kiln. The latter also shares the same bell shape as the copper sulfate piece. Some of these connections may be coincidental, but they are suggested by the painter's idiosyncratic composition and illustrate how the interplay between natural measurement and creative imagination gave birth to something entirely new.

=== Minerals and animals ===
In ms. Egerton 747, simple products derived from animal or mineral substances are illustrated either by pen-and-ink sketches, or by figurative scenes showing the harvesting or extraction process. The latter feature poorly proportioned, crudely drawn figures, and stand out for their unprofessional appearance in comparison with the plant illustrations. However, these scenes have been copied throughout the iconographic tradition of the Tractatus de herbis to the point of constituting its main feature, and, once re-elaborated by more expert artists, have become far more attractive. In most manuscripts of the Book of Simple Medicines, figurative scenes receive special attention: they emphasize the detail of costumes, and depict lively poses and a plausible rendering of space.

Evolution of the depiction of the extraction of the Armenian bowl ("De bolo armenico") from the Tractatus to the Book of Simple Medicines

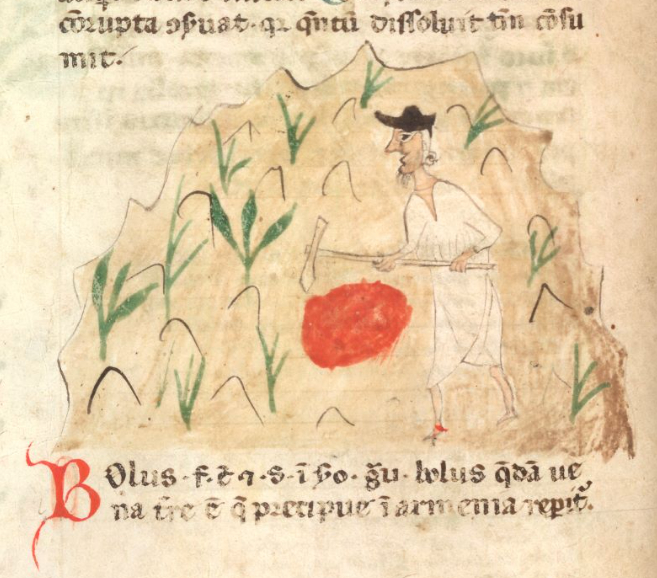
ms. Egerton 747

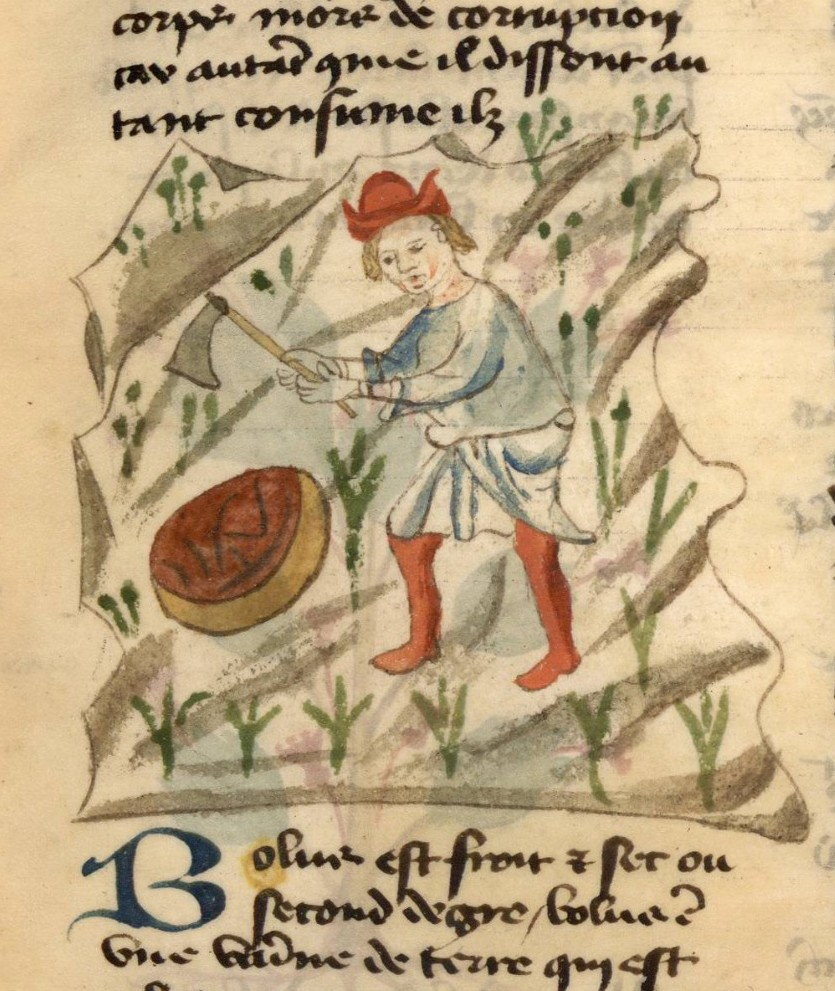
ms. fr. 19081

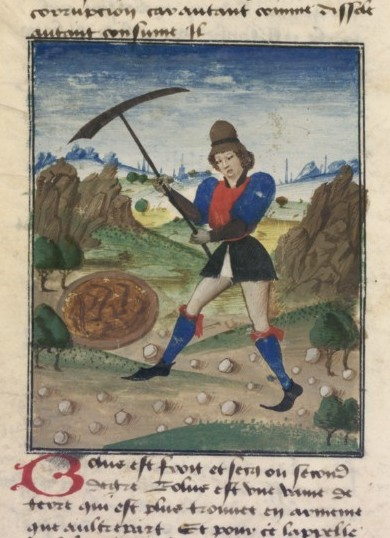
ms. fr. 623

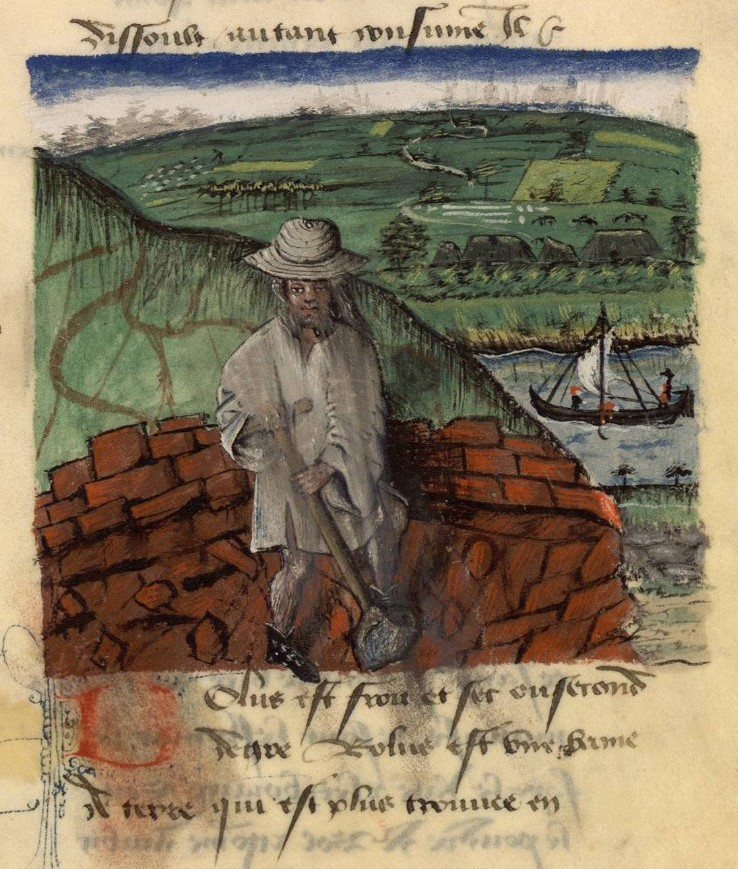
ms. fr. 12321

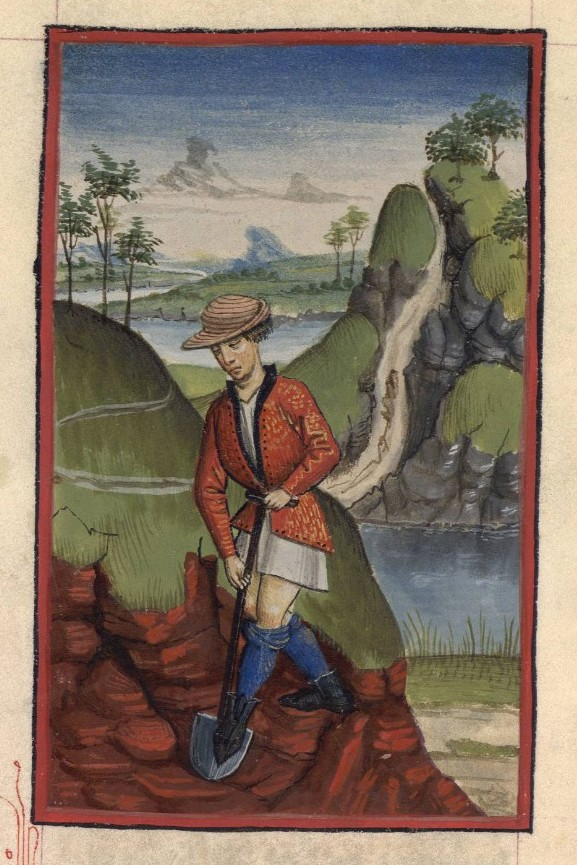
ms. fr. 12319

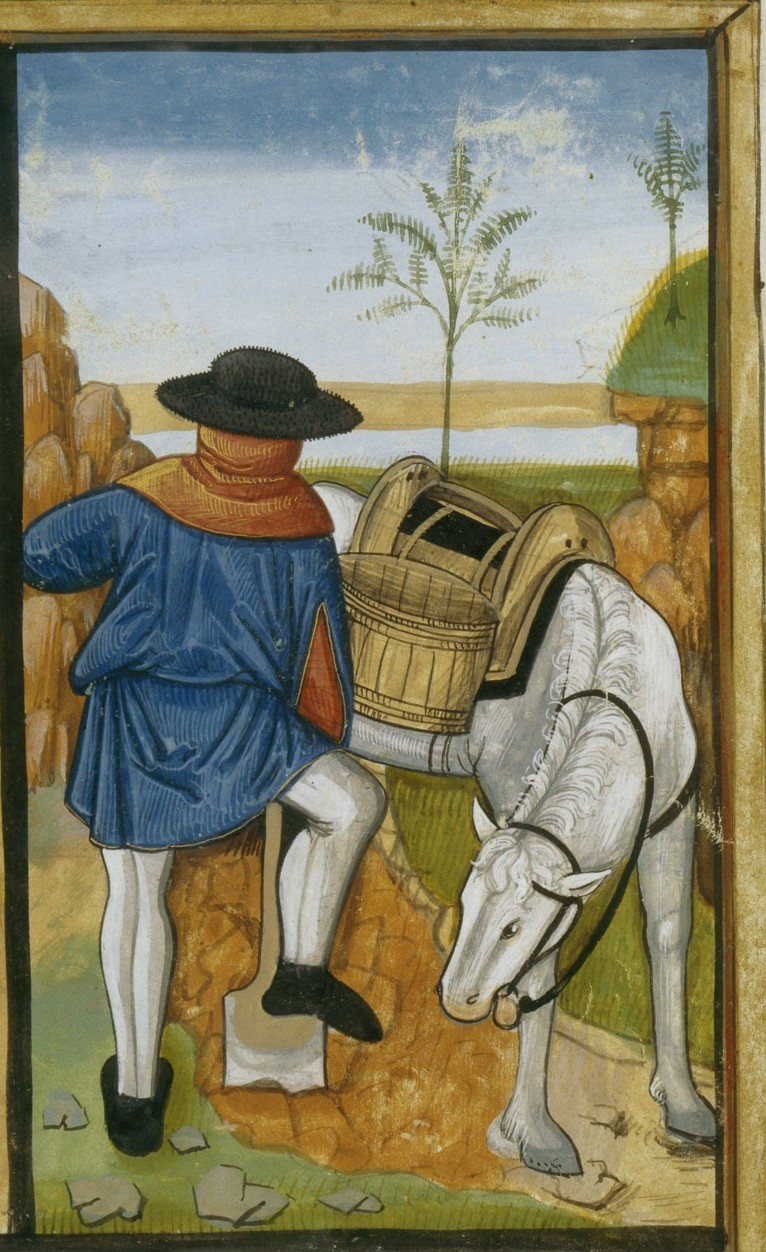
ms. fr. 12322

The London manuscript contains two hunting scenes marked by the illuminator's ignorance of the animals involved. Castoreum, a secretion from the beaver's glands, is interpreted as coming from its testicles: the mammal, depicted as a kind of deer, castrates itself with its own teeth in the hope of leaving hunters the product of their hunt. Musk-producing Asian chevrotains are also unrecognizable. The depiction of the ivory-supplying elephant (see above), although much more common in medieval art, is equally inaccurate: the animal resembles a pig with a trunk, short hair along the back, tusks that grow abruptly upwards and marked ribs. Latin ms. 6823 is scarcely richer or more accurate in its animal representations, but the Tractatus is followed by a short illustrated treatise dedicated to birds and fish. This is probably a reminiscence of a complete version of Sextus Placitus' Liber medicinae ex animalibus, a late antique text transmitted in the same medical corpus as Pseudo-Apuleius' Herbarius. In the manuscripts of the Northern Italian group derived from Manfred's version, the chapters of the text are integrated into the single chapters of the Tractatus in alphabetical order. Following a tradition common in herbariums, most manuscripts finally include numerous illustrations of snakes, spiders and scorpions. These are shown opposite paragraphs describing antidotes for their respective bites or stings.

=== Doctores et magistri ===
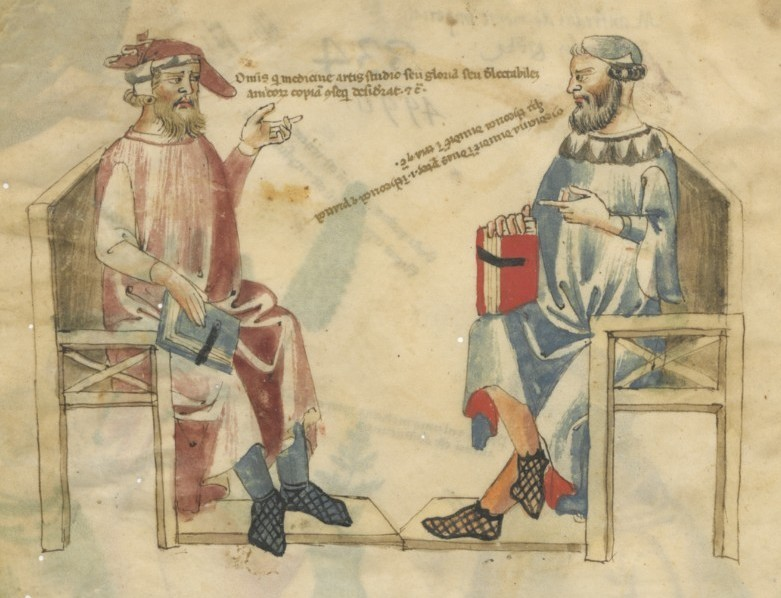
Discussion between Hippocrates and Johannitius in ms. 6823, fo 1 vo.

The incipit pages of the Tractatus de herbis and the antidotary (see above) in ms. Egerton 747 are decorated with borders in a style and technique very different from the other illustrations. According to Minta Collins, they closely resemble the work of Jacobellus of Salerno, an illuminator active in the last years of the 13th century: curved tendrils in the corners form roundels containing heads or grotesques on a gold background, some with wings in the shape of small acanthus leaves. The colors (blue-gray, rust and madder enhanced with white) are also typical of the artist's illuminations. The initials of both texts feature busts of figures on a gold-leaf background. They are wearing the distinctive garb of university doctors in Italy at the end of the thirteenth and fourteenth centuries: a cape lined and edged with petit-gris, a subtunic and a two-pointed cap on a white headdress. The straight, elongated lines of the noses and the pronounced treatment of the pupils also resemble the style used by Jacobellus to depict faces.

Latin ms. 6823 also shows doctors in the initials of the incipits of the Tractatus (see above) and the Antidotarium. Their style has consistently been described as Northern Italian, and the illuminations attributed to artists from Bologna, Lombardy or Pisa. For Minta Collins, on the other hand, the two pages were likely commissioned from Lippo Vanni or one of his close associates. Although the painter is well documented as having been active in Siena in 1344, he may also have worked in Naples in the preceding years, which remains compatible with the thesis of the manuscript's southern origin. Two folios of the preface also contain pen-and-wash figures of famous medical authors, whose style has been compared to that of Roberto D'Oderisio's frescoes in the Santa Maria Incoronata church in Naples. A bearded figure in hooded robes is usually identified as Manfred himself, facing a group of doctors presenting him with plants to identify. The following folios show four pairs of famous doctors seated on benches and engaged in discussion, each identified by an aphorism taken from his works and forming like a phylactery. The first two represent Hippocrates and Johannitius, then Hippocrates and Galen, three classical authors whose works formed part of the basic corpus of the medical curriculum in Salerno and Naples. Next come Jean Mésué and Barthélémy of Salerno, then Averroès and Porphyre of Tyre, commentators on the former and on Aristotle. The ms. Palatino 586 from Florence begins with a comparable series of seven physicians: Adam, Hippocrates, Avicenna, Johannitius, Averroes, Jean Mésué and Serapion. It is possible that ms. Egerton 747 also began with portraits of medical authors that have not been preserved.

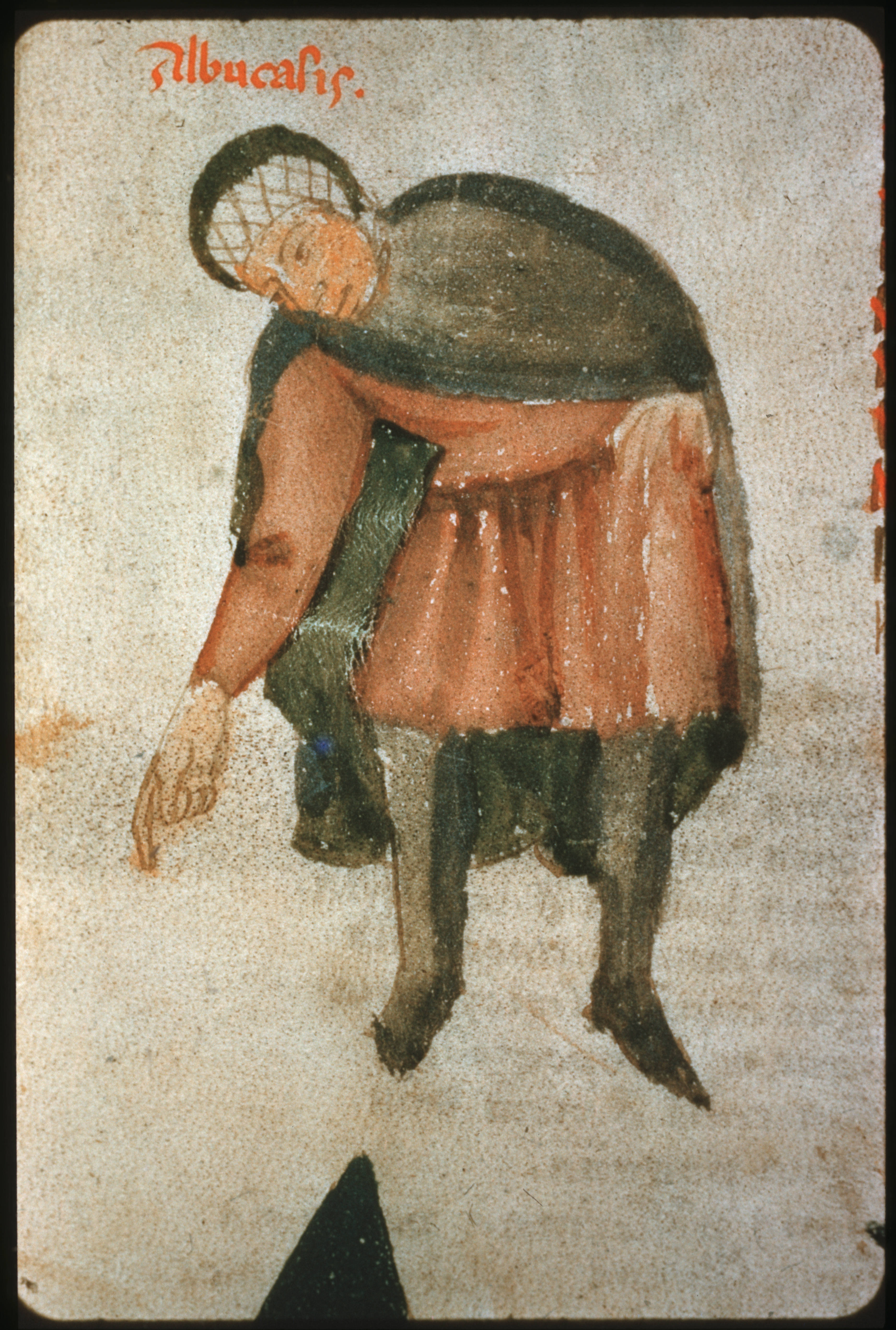
Ms. Chigi F. VII. 158, fo 49 ro: Albucasis bent over to pick a single.

In subsequent manuscripts, the motif of medical men is often repeated in other forms. The ms. Chigi F. VII. 158 from the Vatican presents a very complete series, opening with a depiction of Dioscorides picking strawberries, opposite another unidentified figure. Thereafter, each alphabetical summary is accompanied by a full-length illustration of a scholar examining one of the simples presented on the folio, surmounted by the name of a famous medical author. Most are dressed in long, brightly colored garments, while a few wear short tunics, perhaps because they were not considered professional physicians. Of the authors represented, nine are Greek: Dioscorides, Galen (initial A), Democritus (B), Moschion (D), Oribasius (F), Alexander of Tralles (G), Paul of Aegina (H), Palladius and Gerodius (Note: This is Simon de Gênes's distorted name for the Greek hippiatrist Hierocles.) (N); nine are Latin: Antyllus (E), Butanicus (Note: Butanicus or Butanicus de simplicibus medicinis is a work often cited by Simon of Genoa, but otherwise unknown.) (T), Cornelius Celsus (X), Macer Floridus (Y), Pliny the Elder (Z), Isidore of Seville, Cassius Felix and Theodore Priscian (present on other folios, among the herbs); and ten are Arabic: Abrahamn (Note: There are many medieval physicians of Jewish origin known by the name of Abraham. See, for example, Abraham de Tortose.) (C), Avicenna (I), Albucasis (K), Serapion (L), Açaraviusnote 23 (M), Avenzoar (O), Jean Mésué (P), Isaac Israeli (R), Haly Abbas (S) and Rhazès (V).

The illuminators of ms. 459 of the Casanatense may have been inspired by this series to decorate the initial of the first chapter of each alphabetical section with the bust of an anonymous magister. Some are women, others wear the symbolic turban of Arab physicians, and many have their hands raised in typical teacher gestures. They form a genealogy of illustrious physicians reminiscent of the series of portraits of ancestors typical of several other contemporary Visconti manuscripts. The theme can also be seen in the Livre des simples médecines, some of whose manuscripts feature a bordered incipit featuring several doctors. They are depicted in full activity: reading, teaching, examining a patient, inspecting a urinal or heating a still. The figure of Galen is also often present, to suggest the theoretical and historical basis of the medical arts.

== Functions and reading ==
The Tractatus de herbis is the result of a late thirteenth-century scholar's compilation of the pharmacological and botanical knowledge of the time. While such collections of texts were common complements to therapeutic theory and practice, the treatise's unknown author departed from several centuries of medieval tradition by including over 400 images in his communication strategy. This choice proved a winning one, as the numerous manuscripts that followed it prove, and readers in the 16th century were still consulting in printed form a treatise that had retained the essential structure and content of its ancestor. The exact function of the Tractatus remains unknown, however, and is likely to have varied over its more than 200 years of use.

=== Field guide ===
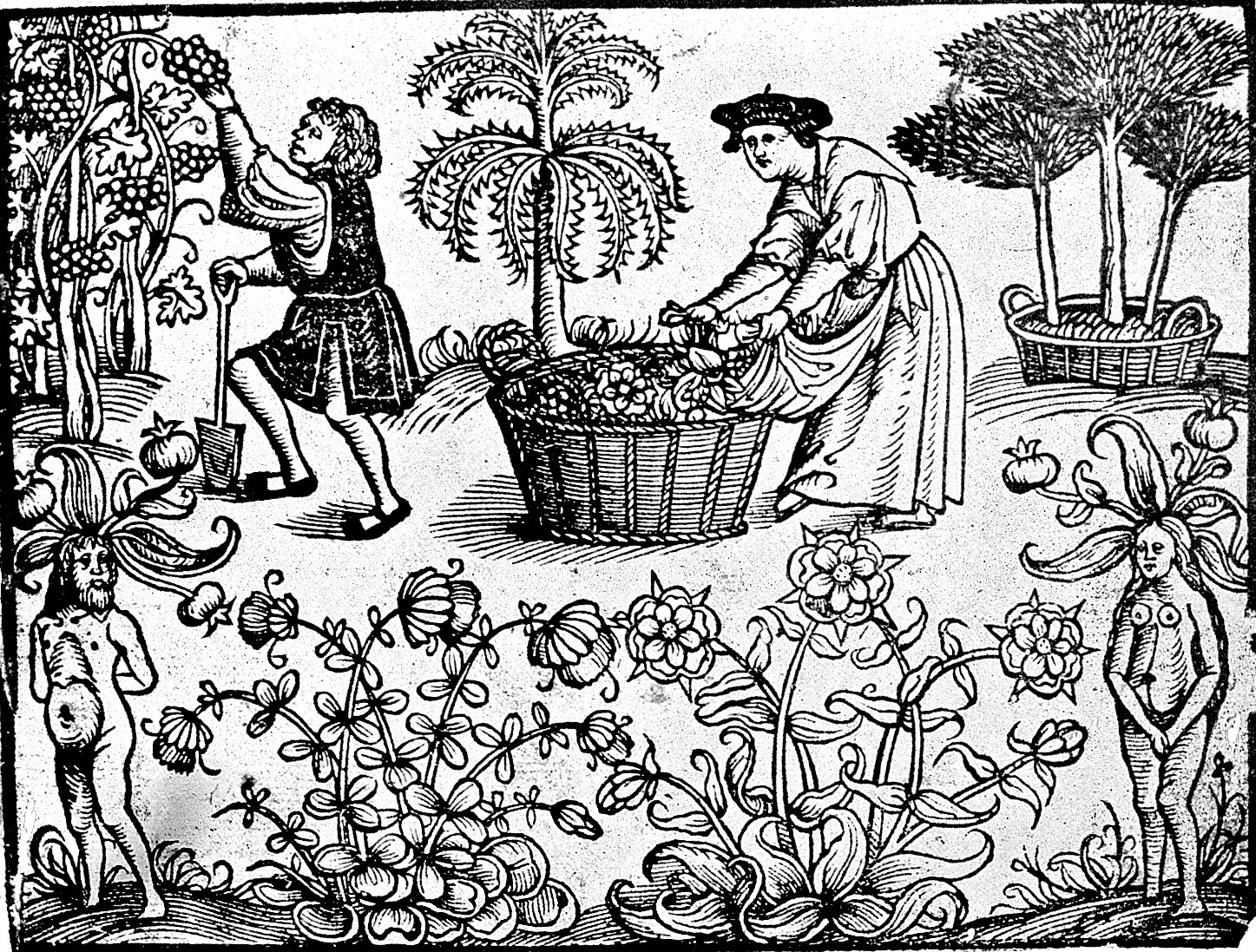
Singers on the front cover of Grete Herball, 1526.

The most striking feature of the early versions of the treatise is the presence of several hundred images whose naturalism has attracted the attention of art historians. The plant illustrations are remarkably descriptive, and in this respect stand out significantly from the imagery used at the time. Drawing on the work of science historian Charles Singer, Otto Pächt considers medieval herbariums to be field guides, asserting that "the illustration of these manuals would be useless to the herbalist (and physician) if the plants were not depicted with such veracity that they could be easily identified". From this perspective, most earlier works would have failed to achieve this standard by tirelessly copying the same useless images, and the success of the Secreta Salernitana would be due to the high informational value of their observation of nature.

Although intuitively obvious, the idea that medieval images were primarily used to identify plants in the wild is contradicted by further analysis. First of all, it's hard to imagine that a volume as costly and cumbersome as ms. Egerton 747 could have been taken into the field. It should also be noted that the vast majority of medieval herbariums did not include any images, and that at the time the Tractatus was produced, scholars likely to use it received their plant material in prepared form, as is the case today. Medicinal plant gatherers are identified in contemporary texts as rustici, a social group that the English scholar Roger Bacon describes as illiterate, and who were certainly not the target audience for such treatises. The true function of illustrated herbariums therefore remains a much more open question than Pächt's or Singer's statements might suggest.

=== Ordinatio and Compilatio ===
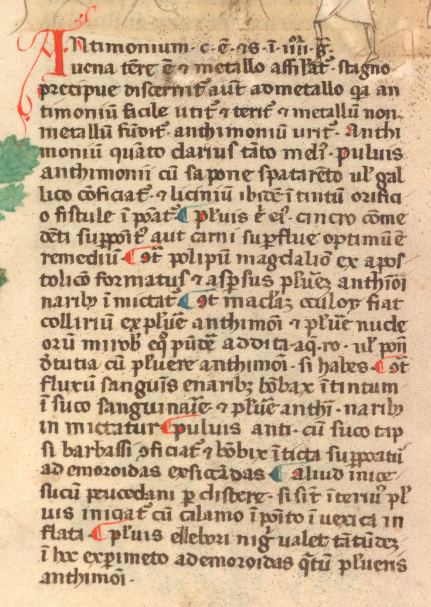
Colorful flyswatters point to the substance's virtues against cancer, polyps, ophthalmological problems, nosebleeds and more.

The Tractatus de herbis was conceived during a period of transition in Western scholarship that saw the establishment, between the 11th and 14th centuries, of new scholarly thinking practices and a shift from meditative monastic reading to analytical scholastic reading. According to a thesis by British paleographer Malcolm Parkes, this change was partly due to the development in the books of the concepts of Ordinatio ("order, arrangement") and Compilatio ("compilation"). The former refers to the functional characteristics and organization of a work written for ease of reference, while the latter describes the concern to study an argument from beginning to end by providing the auctores in toto, the author's original and complete corpus. Readers who previously depended on glosses could now form an informed opinion thanks to a new textual structure, which would have fostered the development of the analytical and systematic reading to which modern scholars are accustomed.

The Tractatus de herbis in ms. Egerton 747 is a practical analogue of Parkes' thesis. Its form has been designed to help the reader find certain types of information easily (Ordinatio): a table of contents opens almost every alphabetical section, and within each table, each item is highlighted by a pied-de-mouche (the C of capitulum, "chapter") alternately in red or blue. In the body of the text, entries are indicated by an image and the name of the substance. The latter is introduced by a littera notabilior, an enlarged letter designed to mark the beginning of a textual unit, which is colored alternately red or blue. Each substance is itself associated with a series of remedies, and the quotation evoking each treatment is in turn marked by a red or blue pied-de-mouche. A reader familiar with the Latin name of a substance could thus easily locate it in the treatise thanks to the alphabetical summaries, and then just as easily find each of its therapeutic uses.

In terms of content, the manuscript adheres strictly to the Compilatio principle, presenting summarized versions of authoritative texts reorganized and supplemented to provide a complete picture of available knowledge. The result is often compared with the Liber de virtutibus herbarum, a slightly later treatise based on the same sources and compiled comparably. It is the work of a certain Rufinus, who presents himself as a scholar who had applied himself to the seven arts in Naples and Bologna, and who, after learning astronomy, went on to study the science of plants. It is possible that the anonymous author of the Tractatus was a medical man with a similar scholarly background.

=== Copies for bibliophiles ===
Manfred de Monte Imperiale's version of the Tractatus shares the same erudition as Egerton's 747 and is, in a way, the culmination of his compilation process. But from the second half of the 14th century, the function of the Tractatus evolved in another direction. In Northern Italy, the Masson 116 ms. was never completed, and lost its scientific value by presenting only images. Its descendants, the mss. Casanatense 459 and Sloane 4016, are sumptuous works illustrated by leading artists, intended above all for a wealthy elite.

In 15th-century France, princes such as Charles d'Anjou, Louis de Bruges, Isabelle de Portugal, Charles d'Orléans and even King Louis XII had a Livre des simples médecines made or owned. While the passage in the vernacular might a priori have made the treatise more accessible, a closer examination of the text shows quite the opposite. The preservation of the order of the lists according to the initial of their name in Latin requires knowledge of both the Latin terminology and the French translation in order to locate a substance in the work. Generally speaking, the layout of translated versions features a smaller number of visual cues. The system of "pieds-de-mouches" to indicate the various therapeutic indications is often omitted, and the lists of synonyms that open each entry are truncated. The French version does, however, include several new features: an alphabetical glossary to help explain the more learned terms, often translated literally from Latin, and an index of effective remedies for various ailments, starting with headaches and ending with more general disorders such as fever or poisons. Most of the plant illustrations are copied from ms. Egerton 747, but the physical details, notably the shape of leaves and flowers, are often simplified and sometimes misinterpreted. Human figures, on the other hand, are far more numerous and depicted in carefully executed, brightly coloured scenes. Certain substances known specifically to treat royal patients, such as musk, deer heart bone or lynx stone, are specifically enhanced with gold leaf in several manuscripts. As with earlier versions of the treatise, it is difficult to determine the function of the images and to judge whether they served to inform, aid mnemonics, visually signal entries or simply assert some degree of textual authority. But without saying that the Livre des simples médecines were not consulted for their medical content, it seems clear that the original scientific purpose of the treatise gradually gave way to the interests of bibliophiles.

Example of the evolution of illustrations: the "De appio emorroidarum" chapter

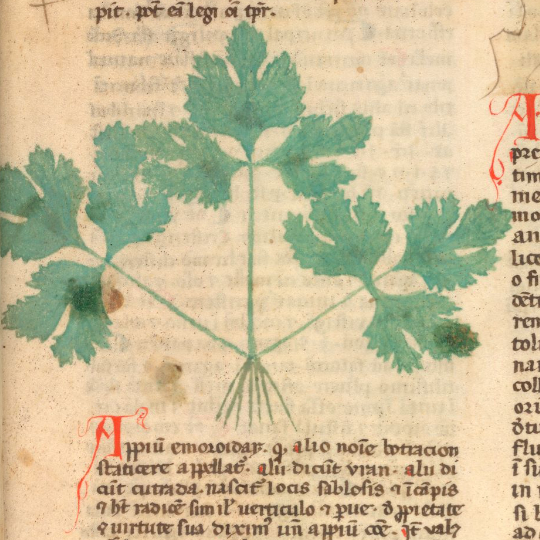
Tractatus de herbis: the image shows three basal palmate leaves, deeply indented and long-stalked.

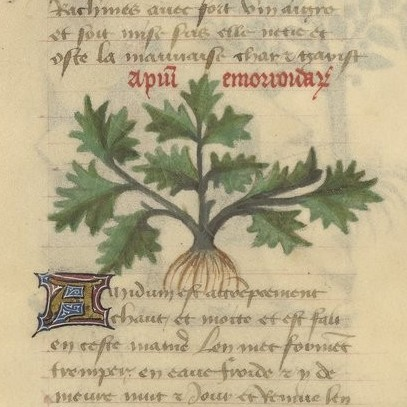
Livre des simples médecines (ms. 2888 from the Bibliothèque de l'Arsenal, Paris): the image of the plant no longer has any descriptive value.

=== The end of a tradition ===
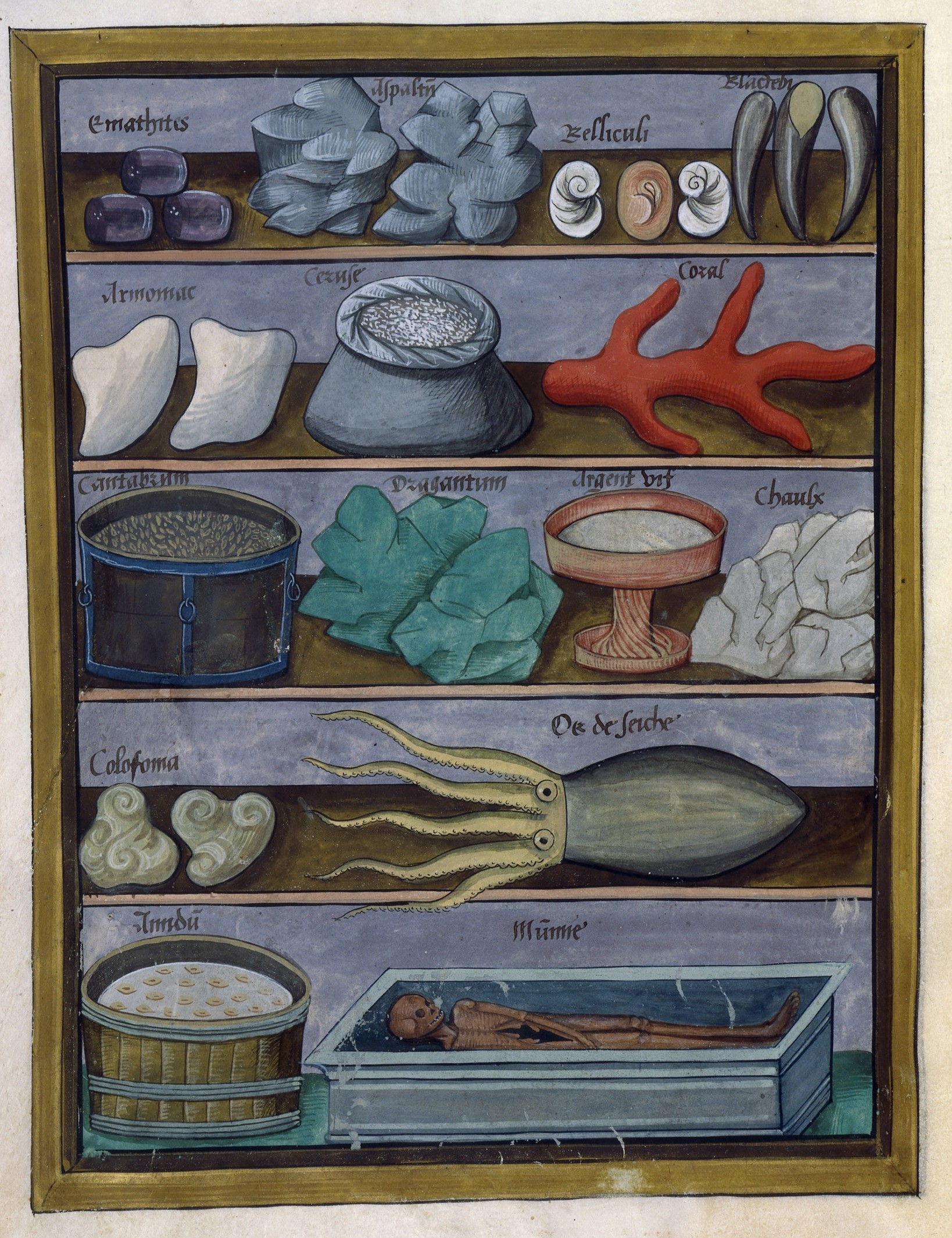
"L'étagère à simples" in French ms. 12322, fo 191 vo

The Livre des simples médecines cycle comes to an end with two manuscripts whose layout and iconography mark the end of the tradition and herald a new approach to the subject. These are the ms. fr. F. v. VI, 1 from the Russian National Library in St. Petersburg, (Note: It is one of the many manuscripts acquired by Russian diplomat Pierre Doubrovski in Saint-Germain-des-Prés during the French Revolution.) illuminated by Robinet Testard for Charles d'Angoulême and Louise de Savoie between 1489 and 1495, and its replica from the first quarter of the 16th century, French ms. 12322 from the Bibliothèque nationale de France. Their first singularity is that the illustrations that previously accompanied each chapter have been extracted to form a separate "album". The text itself, rather than following alphabetical order, is divided into five successive sections by category of substance: "herbs", "trees, fruits and resins", "metals and minerals", "animal matter" and "other substances". The arrangement of the images, however, is only very partially in keeping with this plan, and the album that follows the text is divided into just two parts: the first is devoted to grasses, and the second to trees and shrubs. In each of these sections are interspersed folios that break the apparent rule. One contains several frames with figurative scenes (metal and mineral extraction, aloe wood fishing) and the whale from which ambergris is extracted. Two others are compositions in the form of landscapes combining several singles. Finally, the rest of the non-vegetable substances are collected on a single folio in the form of a double-sided cupboard, the shelves of which are loaded with labeled samples.

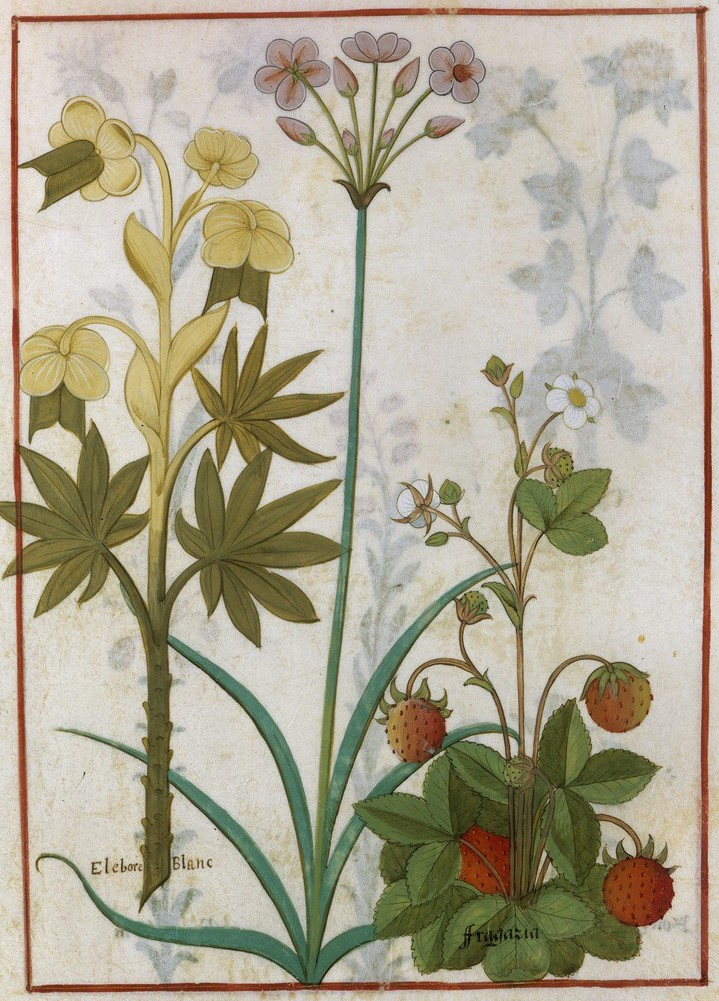
Representations (Note: While white hellebore (left) and strawberry (right) are plants traditionally dealt with in the Tractatus, no mention is made of butoma (center).) in "realistic" style in French ms. 12322, fo 153 ro.

Overall, the album only partially covers the content of the text, illustrating only 324 of the 486 chapters of the Livre des simples médecines. This discrepancy is difficult to explain, but could mean that the St. Petersburg manuscript was never actually completed, perhaps following the untimely death of its recipient, Charles d'Angoulême. While half of the plant figures reproduce the schematic mode of the tradition, the others are of a realistic type, in complete break with the illustrative cycle of the Tractatus de herbis, and for the most part painted after nature for the original manuscript. Thirteen plants are also represented in duplicate, in both styles, and some sixty are not mentioned anywhere in the text.

Although they are not the first versions to have reinterpreted or modified the treatise's original layout, the St. Petersburg manuscript and its Parisian copy represent a clear enough break that is not accidental. The need to reorganize the simplicities according to different, more "modern" criteria, and the apparent weariness with two-dimensional plant representations, clearly show that the two-hundred-year-old tradition was already no longer deemed satisfactory. Change seemed obvious and inevitable, and the Tractatus was soon to be replaced by precise botanical illustrations and printed herbariums. The Grant Herbier en françoys and its translation Grete Herball, the last representatives of the tradition, would in turn disappear in the second half of the sixteenth century, following the introduction into European pharmacopoeias of products from the New World and Paracelsian medical principles.

=== Manuscript list ===
Reference	Origin and dating	External link	Facsimile
London, British Library, Egerton 747.	Southern Italy (?), between 1280 and 1350.	Digitized manuscript	Collins 2003
Paris, Bibliothèque nationale de France, Latin 6823.	Southern Italy (?), early 14th century.	Digitized manuscript	
Florence, Bibliothèque nationale centrale, Palatino 586.	Southern France, circa 1350.	Digitized manuscript	
New York, Morgan Library and Museum, M.873.	Northern Italy (Veneto), between 1350 and 1375.	Digitized manuscript	Leducq et al. 2019
Paris, Bibliothèque de l'École des Beaux-Arts, Masson 116.	Northern Italy (Padua), circa 1370.	Digitized manuscript	Cavarra et al. 2002
Rome, Casanatense Library, 459.	Northern Italy (Milan), late 14th century.	Digitized manuscript	González and Herrero 2003
Londres, British Library, Sloane 4016.	Northern Italy, late 14th or early 15th century.	Digitized manuscript	Touwaide 2013
Munich, Library of LMU Munich, Cim. 79.	North of the Alps, after 1440.	Digitized manuscript	
Private collection, Sotheby's sale June 25, 1985, lot 64.	Central Europe, mid-15th century	Online instructions	
Basel, University Library, K II 11.	East-Central German space, circa 1450.	Digitized manuscript	
Modena, Biblioteca Estense, alfa.l.09.28	France (Bourg-en-Bresse), 1458.	Digitized manuscript	
Vatican, Apostolic Library, Chigi F.VIII. 188.	Northern Italy, second half of the 15th century.		
Vatican, Apostolic Library, Ross. 1067	15th century		
Sienne, Biblioteca Comunale degli Intronati, L. VIII. 18.	Italy, last quarter of the 15th century.		
Copenhagen, Royal Library, Thott 191 2	France, 15th century.		

== See also ==
- List of florilegia and botanical codices
- Medieval medicine of Western Europe
- Herbarium

== Bibliography ==
- Camus, Jules (1886). L'Opera salernitana "Circa instans": ed il testo primitivo del " Grant Herbier en francoys " secondo due codici del secolo XV. Modène: conservati nella regia biblioteca estense.
- Pächt, Otto (1950). "Early Italian Nature Studies and the Early Calendar Landscape". Journal of the Warburg and Courtauld Institutes. 13 (1/2): 13–47. doi:10.2307/750141. JSTOR 750141.
- Baumann, Felix Andreas (1974). Das Erbario carrarese und die Bildtradition des Tractatus de herbis: ein Beitrag zur Geschichte der Pflanzendarstellung im Übergang von Spätmittelalter zur. Frührenaissance. ISBN 9783716500187.
- Avril, François (1986). Étude codicologique et artistique », dans Matthaeus Platearius, Ghislaine Malandin, Le Livre des simples médecines: d'après le manuscrit français 12322 de la Bibliothèque nationale de Paris. Editions Ozalid et textes cardinaux. ISBN 2-905904-00-3.
- Segre Rutz, Vera (2003). Historia plantarum: Erbe, oro e medicina nei codici medievali. Franco Cosimo Panini.
- Segre Rutz, Vera (2006). La tradizione iconografica dei Secreta Salernitana. SISMEL edizioni del Galluzzo.
- Givens, Jean A. (2006). Reading and Writing the Illustrated Tractatus de herbis, 1280-1526 Visualizing medieval medicine and natural history. Ashgate Publishing. ISBN 9780754652960.
- Givens, Jean A. (2008). The Illustrated Tractatus de Herbis: Images, Information, and Communication Design. Science and Literature at the Crossroads.
- Ventura, Iolanda (2009). Edizione dans Ps. Bartholomaeus Mini de Senis, Tractatus de herbis: Ms London. British Library. ISBN 978-88-8450-356-5.
- Holler, Theresa (2018). Naturmaß, künstlerisches Maß und die Maßlosigkeit ihrer Anwendung. Simplicia in zwei 'Tractatus de herbis'-Handschriften des 13. und 14. Jahrhunderts. Das Mittelalter. doi:10.1515/mial-2018-0006.
- Adriana Cavarra, Angela; Segre Rutz, Vera; Torroncelli, Annamaria; Ceccopieri, Isabella. Historia plantarum: ms 459 Biblioteca Casanatense, l'enciclopedia medica dell'imperatore Venceslao. Franco Cosimo Panini. ISBN 978-88-8290-067-0.
- Collins, Minta (2003). A medieval herbal: a facsimile of British Library Egerton MS 747. British Library. ISBN 978-0-7123-4789-1.
- Ángel González Manjarrés, Miguel; Herrero Ingelmo, María Cruz (2003). Dioscórides Latino. Testimonio Compañía Editorial. ISBN 84-95767-41-4.
- Touwaide, Alain (2013). Tractatus de Herbis: Sloane MS. 4016. M. Moleiro. ISBN 978-84-96400-80-1.
- Leducq, Alexandre; Laurioux, Bruno; Ventura, Iolanda; Cordonnier, Rémy (2019). L'herbier : Tractatus de herbis. École Nationale Supérieure des Beaux-Arts. ISBN 978-2-84056-664-9.
- Collins, Minta (2000). "The Tractatus de Herbis". Medieval Herbals: The Illustrative Traditions. University of Toronto Press. pp. 239–298. ISBN 978-0-8020-8313-5.
- Touwaide, Alain (2011). Commentary: Tractatus de Herbis - Sloane 4016 The British Library, London. M. Moleiro.
- PDR (22 April 2014). "Tractatus de Herbis (ca.1440)". Collections / Images.
- British Library
  - BL (2022a). "Detailed record for Sloane 4016". Catalogue of Illuminated Manuscripts.
  - BL (2022b). "Detailed record for Egerton 747". Catalogue of Illuminated Manuscripts.
