= Black Death in Italy =

Bubonic plague pandemic

1346–1353 spread of the Black Death in Europe map

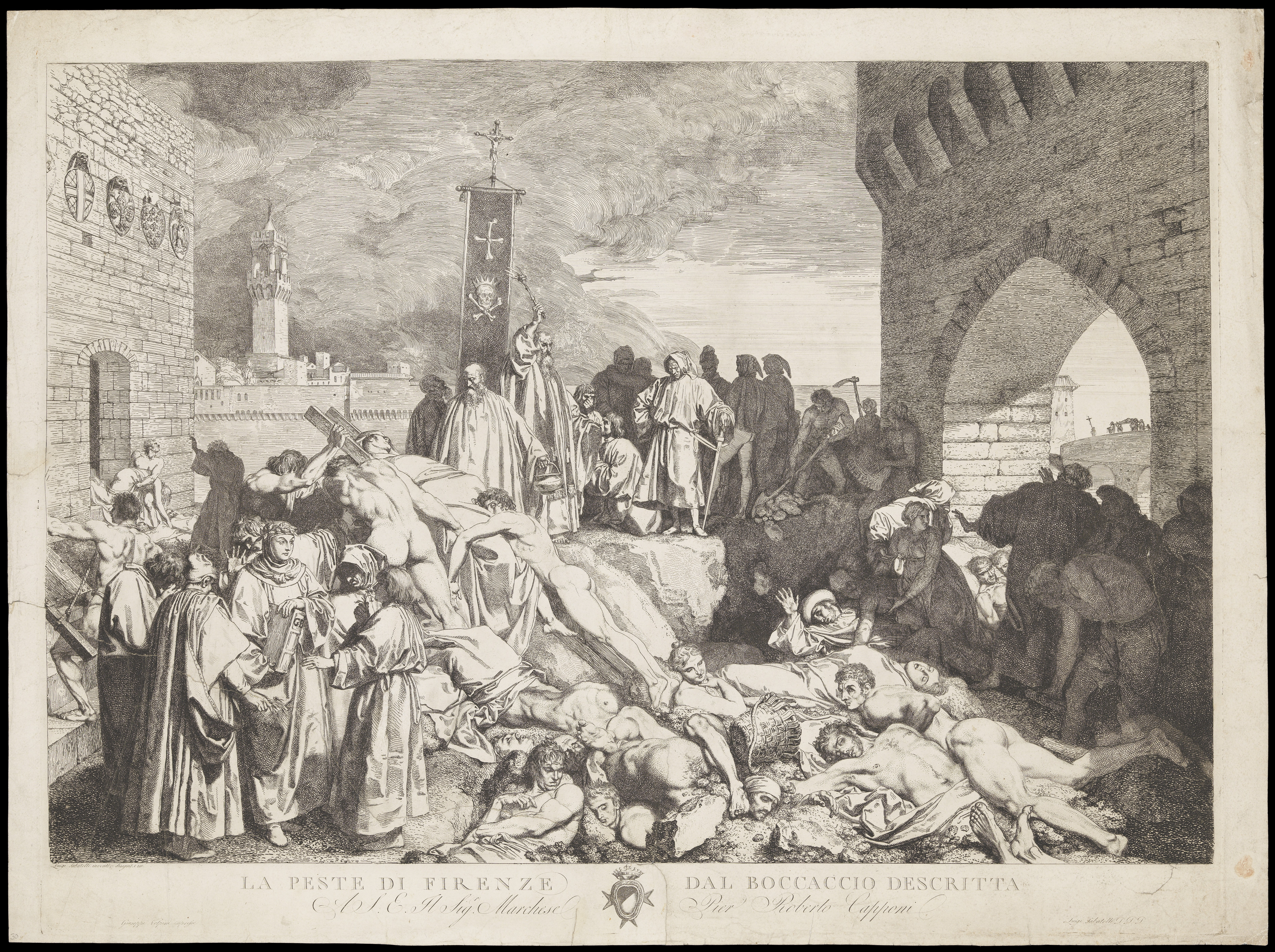
An engraving by Luigi Sabatelli (1772–1850) of Florence during the plague in 1348, based on Giovanni Boccaccio's The Decameron

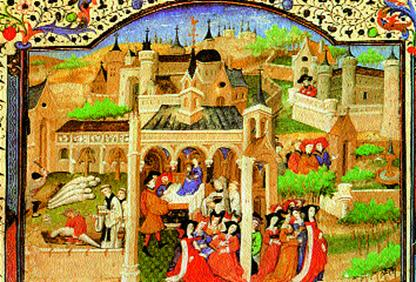
Decameron; The plague of Florence

The Black Death was present in Italy between 1347 and 1348. Sicily and the Italian Peninsula was the first area in then Catholic Western Europe to be reached by the Bubonic plague pandemic known as the Black Death, which reached the region by an Italian ship from the Crimea which landed in Messina in Sicily in October 1347.

Coming to a completely unprepared region, the Black Death was a shock to Italy and to Europe. The Black Death in Italy belongs to the most documented among its outbreaks in Europe, with many literate eyewitnesses, among them being Giovanni Boccaccio, Marchionne di Coppo Stefani, and Agnolo di Tura, whose descriptions of it in their own cities and areas have become famous.

The well-organized and Urban city republics of Central and Northern Italy had the most well-developed administration in Europe prior to the Black Death; their documentation has provided among the most useful descriptions of the pandemic, and the preventive measures and regulations initiated by the Italian city-states during and following the Black Death pandemic has been referred to as the foundation of modern quarantine law regulation.

== Background ==
=== Italy in the mid-14th century ===
When the Black Death reached modern-day Italy, it was roughly divided into the Kingdom of Sicily and the Kingdom of Naples in the south, the Papal States in the middle, and the heavily urbanized Northern Italy, which formally belonged to the Holy Roman Empire but in reality, divided into several autonomous city republics or principalities.

=== The Black Death ===
The traditional story of how the plague first came to Europe was that it was introduced to Europe via Genoese traders from their slave trade port city of Kaffa in the Crimea. During a protracted siege of the city, the Mongol Golden Horde army of Jani Beg, whose mainly Tatar troops were suffering from the disease, catapulted infected corpses over the city walls of Kaffa to infect the inhabitants. When the plague spread inside the city, the Genoese ships in the harbor fled from Kaffa toward Italy, bringing the plague with them. This story is now largely discredited as a xenophobic blame narrative.

== Plague migration ==
=== Southern Italy ===
The arrival of the Black Death in Sicily has been described by the chronicler Michele da Piazza. In October 1347, 12 Genoese ships from the East arrived at Messina in Sicily. After the Genoese came ashore, the inhabitants of Messina started to develop abscesses, cough, and die. The Genoese were immediately banished from the city, but the illness spread so quickly that the city experienced a collapse of social order. The sick wished to be cured, to make wills, and to take the confession, but physicians, notaries, and priests were infected and soon refused to go near them; people abandoned their homes, which criminals pillaged without being stopped by the guards and officials, who also died.

In Sicily, Messina was pointed out as a city God had condemned for its sins. Refugees from Messina fled toward Catania to ask the statue of Saint Agatha to be brought to Messina to appeal to God. Still, the citizens of Catania locked the gates to them. They were instead allowed to take the statue of the Virgin Mary from Santa Maria della Scala to Messina.

During November, refugees desperately fled from Messina in all directions, dying on the roads and spreading the plague all over the island of Sicily, including Catania, which became the 2nd plague centre of the island. One of the royal family members, John, Duke of Randazzo, fled from Catania to the forest of Mascalia, where he was referred to as the last plague victim in Sicily in April 1348.

=== Central Italy ===
According to Agnolo di Tura, the Black Death migrated from Genova to Pisa in January 1348. It spread from Pisa to the rest of Central Italy: to Piombino, Lucca in February, to Florence in March, and Siena, Perugia, and Orvieto in April and May 1348. Agnolo di Tura described how people abandoned their loved ones whose bodies were thrown down holes all over the city of Siena, but how no one cried because everyone thought that they would soon die as well. The survivors pleasured themselves with food, wine, pleasure hunting and games. When the plague finally left Siena, the cities rulers had died, as well as the artists Ambrogio and Pietro Lorenzetti: Agnolo di Tura claimed that only 8 people remained alive in Siena when the plague left.

The Black Death in Florence has been famously described by Giovanni Boccaccio. In the autumn of 1347, rumours had reached the city about a significant epidemic. To prevent it from reaching Florence, the city streets were cleaned, ill travellers were refused entry, the authorities instructed all inhabitants to keep their houses, streets, and squares empty and not allow animals entry into the city, butchers were mandated to strict hygienic regulations, prostitutes and homosexuals were banned from the city to lessen the wrath of God, and processions of prayers were held in public to prevent the plague from reaching the city.

In March 1348, the plague reached Florence, lasting until July. Neither formally educated medical doctors nor the traditional male and female folk healers and medical practitioners could do anything about it. The infected died within 3 days. People were infected by the smallest contact, even with the clothes or other objects handled by the ill. Boccaccio witnessed dead bodies being thrown out upon the streets, after which the animals who started to touch them fell dead. Priests and other authorities died so swiftly that the administration and law and order collapsed. People refused to bury their dead, who were instead buried by a special group of grave diggers recruited from the poorest beggars, the becchini, who charged enormous sums to throw the bodies in mass graves. Those who could not pay left the bodies on the street, which were soon full of rotting corpses. In the countryside outside Florence, the peasantry fell dead in their fields which were abandoned by the living, who let loose their animals and ate their supplies because they lost any hope of surviving. Matteo Villani described how people in Florence, expecting their death, lived to enjoy life without consequences: the poor ignored the class system. They started to eat luxury food and dress like dead aristocrats, and people started to marry anyone they wished without considering class, status, or suitability.

Giovanni Boccaccio claimed that 100,000 people died in Florence. This is not possible because the entire city population did not reach that number, but the death toll was nonetheless very high. One of the most well-known victims was the painter Bernardo Daddi.

The Black Death appears to have reached the city of Rome in August 1348. Rome was experiencing a period of decay. Due to the Pope residing in Avignon, Rome had lost its place as the center of Christianity, and the pilgrims and clerical visitors who used to favour the city had almost been reduced to a local town. Still, the loss of the pilgrimages also meant that the arrival of the Black Death in Rome was delayed.

=== Northern Italy ===
One of the most well-known contemporary descriptions of the Black Death in Northern Italy is the Historia de Morbo by Gabriele de' Mussi. He describes it with a focus on his hometown of Piacenza. According to the chronicle, the plague did not migrate across the Italian Peninsula from the South but was taken directly to Genova and Venice by Genoese plague ships.

The plague came to Piacenza with the Genoese Fulco della Croce, who died shortly after his arrival, followed by his host family and their neighbours. When the plague entered a house through one victim, 3 days remained before all of the inhabitants of that house were dead. The ill called upon physicians to care for them, notaries to make their will, and priests or monks to take their confessions and witness their wills, and all of the visitors took the plague with them when they left; convents, especially, were badly infected through the priests taking the confessions from the sick. Soon, the sick and dying were abandoned by physicians, priests, and their own families, who fled from the illness, and the lonely screams of the dying could be heard from the abandoned houses. The corpses of the dead were left in the abandoned houses, which were closed off in fear of the deceased, and only the richest paid the poorest to bury the remains of the dead. The cemeteries were filled so rapidly that mass burials were arranged, and eventually, the sick started to dig their graves in the middle of the town squares.

Between March and September 1348, in Bologna, many famous academics of the University of Bologna died, including Giovanni d'Andrea. The Black Death of Trento (June 1348) has been described in the chronicle of Giovanni of Parma. In July 1348, two Padua rulers died in succession.

The Black Death of the Republic of Venice has been described in the chronicles of the Doge Andrea Dandolo, the monk Francesco della Grazia, and Lorenzo de Monacis. Venice was one of the biggest cities in Europe, and at this point, it was overcrowded with refugees from the famine in the countryside the year prior and the earthquake in January. In April 1348, the plague reached the crowded city, and the streets became littered with the bodies of the sick, dying, and the dead, and with smells emanating from houses where the dead had been abandoned. Between 25 and 30 people were buried daily in the cemetery near Rialto, and corpses were transported to be buried on islands in the lagoon by people who gradually caught the plague and died themselves. So many Venetians fled the city, including the officials of the state, that the remaining members of the city councils banned the Venetians from leaving the city in July by threatening loss of their position and status if they did, to prevent a collapse of social order.

== Consequences ==
The population decline caused by the Black Death resulted in both smaller taxes and income for the elite, as well as a smaller workforce that demanded better salaries and better conditions from the elite, who reacted to the demands by repression and violence toward their workforce. In parallel, the dissolution of law and order in the countryside during the plague became long-lasting when unemployed mercenaries, known as the Condottiero, took control of the countryside population.

The Black Death in Italy was crucial in developing modern European quarantine laws, health authorities, and hospitals. When the Black Death migrated toward the well-organized urban city-states of Northern Italy, the cities banned travellers from infected areas from entering their city and occasionally also the destruction of textiles and other objects which had been in contact with the sick. From the second half of the 14th century, quarantine regulations against travellers from infected areas were introduced in many cities in Northern Italy (ship quarantine in port cities and hospital quarantine for inland cities), which also strengthened the belief that isolation of the sick was an effective prevention method of epidemic and eventually became common all over Italy and Europe.

== See also ==
- Cronaca fiorentina di Marchionne di Coppo Stefani
