= Agnes of Huntingdonshire =

- Occupations: Medical doctor, Scientist
- Era: 13th century

Agnes of Huntingdonshire (fl. 13th century) was a doctor in Huntingdonshire, England. As a woman, she was unable to attend university and get official medical training. However, uncommon for the time, Agnes was still able to practice medicine and was well-respected in her community.

There is little information available about Agnes's life.
