= Niccolò Rodolico =

Italian historian and professor

Niccolò Rodolico (14 March 1873 – 1969) was an Italian historian, a professor in the University of Messina and the University of Florence.

Born at Trapani, a fishing port in Sicily, after attending the Liceo Ximenes in his home town, where he was a friend of Giovanni Gentile, Rodolico went on to the University of Bologna. There, he was a student of Giosuè Carducci, who directed him towards focussing on the study of history. At first his interests centred on the Late Middle Ages, with particular regard to the social history of Florence. Later, he turned his attention towards modern history and above all that of Tuscany and Southern Italy in the eighteenth century. He took a particular interest in the life and work of the 19th-century monarch Charles Albert of Sardinia.

Rodolico was a close friend of the anti-fascist Gaetano Salvemini, who left the country during the 1920s.

The former King Umberto II, while in exile, nominated Rodolico as a member of the Royal Council of Senators and awarded him the Civil Order of Savoy, the highest honour available to him.

Rodolico died at Fiesole in 1969. A high school in Florence has been named after him.

== Selected publications ==
- Siciliani nello Studio di Bologna nel Medio Evo (1895)
- Dal Comune alla Signoria (1898)
- Il popolo minuto - Note di storia fiorentina (1343-1376) (1899)
- Cronaca fiorentina di Marchionne di Coppo Stefani (ed., 1903)
- La democrazia fiorentina nel suo tramonto (1378-1382) (1905)
- La reggenza lorenese in Toscana (1737-1765) (1908)
- Le condizioni morali della Toscana prima dei lorenesi (1908)
- Stato e Chiesa in Toscana durante la reggenza lorenese (1910)
- La storia d'Italia narrata ai soldati d'Italia del 1916 (1916)
- Gli amici e i tempi di Scipione de' Ricci (1920)
- Il popolo agli inizi del Risorgimento nell'Italia meridionale (1926)
- Carlo Alberto principe di Carignano (1931)
- Carlo Alberto negli anni di regno 1831-1843 (1936)
- Carlo Alberto negli anni 1843-1849 (1943)
- Il popolo minuto in Firenze (1944)
- Lo studio fiorentino in Firenze (1944)
- I Ciompi (1945)
- Libro azzurro sul Referendum 1946 (with V. Prunas-Tola) (1953)
- Storia degli italiani (1954)
- I palazzi del popolo nei comuni toscani del Medio Evo (1962)
- Il Risorgimento vive (1962)
