= Genoese–Mongol Wars =

Late medieval Genoese–Mongol relations

Date	1307–1308; 1343–1347 (Golden Horde sieges of Genoese Caffa); 1430s, 1442, 1453 (Genoa & Golden Horde versus Crimean Khanate); 1460s, 1475 (Gazaria & Crimean Khanate versus Great Horde and Ottomans)
Location	Black Sea coasts, Crimean Peninsula
Result	Inconclusive; Genoese colonies repeatedly destroyed and re-established.; Several Mongol states control Crimean Peninsula.; Ottoman control over Crimea established in 1475.

Belligerents
Republic of Genoa; Genoese Gazaria; Supported by Republic of Venice (1343–1346); Crimean Khanate (1460s–1475)	Golden Horde; Crimean Khanate (till 1460s); Great Horde; Ottoman Empire (1475)

The Genoese–Mongol Wars were a series of conflicts in the early 14th century and the mid-15th century, intermittently fought between the Republic of Genoa and several successor states of the Mongol Empire, most notedly the Golden Horde (later the Great Horde) and the Crimean Khanate. The conflicts concerned control of trade and political influence in the Black Sea and Crimean peninsula.

Initial contacts between the Genoese and Mongol states from the mid- to late 13th century were peaceful and friendly, coinciding with the Pax Mongolica. The occasional conflicts from the early 14th century onwards were interspaced by periods of peace, trade, embargo, détente, and cooperation.

== Background ==
Interactions between the Republic of Genoa and the Mongol Empire began in the early 13th century, as the Mongol invasion of Europe pushed further west. The successful invasions of Kievan Rus', Cumania and Bulgaria in the 1240s established Mongol control of the Crimean peninsula, allowing for the empire to exert influence in the Black Sea.

The Italian city state of Genoa, already the controller of a trading empire in the Mediterranean, was eager to expand its trading power in the region. Genoese merchants had been active in the Black Sea since the mid 13th century, spurred on by the signing of the Treaty of Nymphaeum in 1261 and the Byzantine recapture of Constantinople. Taking advantage of its treaty with the Byzantine Empire and its client states, Genoa established a number of trading colonies (Gazaria) in the Black Sea, Crimean peninsula, Anatolia, and Romania. Most notable among these colonies was Kaffa (established in 1266), which anchored Genoese trade with the near east.

== Early peaceful relations (13th century) ==
Indirect interactions between the Mongols and the Genoese began in the early-mid 13th century, and solidified in the 1260s. Mongol authorities were wary of foreign influence and ruthlessly crushed open resistance to their rule, but generally were welcoming towards merchants - a dichotomy in line with the Pax Mongolica, in which trade was encouraged. This tentative relationship survived the division of the Mongol Empire in 1266, after which the Golden Horde controlled the northern Black Sea coast and the Ilkhanate controlled parts of the southern coast. Trade relations between the successor khanates and the Genoese colonies continued, though disputes over trading rights and Italian residency in Crimea caused tensions to occasionally rise.

Genoese merchants purchased the rights to establish a permanent colony at Kaffa in 1266 with the consent of the Golden Horde, but relations between the expanding Genoese and the Mongols remained unstable; trade prospered during the reign of Mengu-Timur, but deteriorated in the 1280s after Genoa unsuccessfully sent shipbuilders and soldiers to support the Ilkhanate in a war against a Golden Horde-Mamluk alliance.

== Conflicts in the 14th century ==
Relations improved until the ascension of Khan Toqta in 1291, who disagreed with the rights extended to Italian merchants and issued embargoes on Italian goods. In 1307, Toqta laid siege to Kaffa, forcing the Genoese to evacuate and burn the port in 1308. Relations recovered after Toqta's death in 1312, and Kaffa was re-established in 1313. During the reign of Öz Beg Khan, relations remained friendly between the Mongols and Genoese. During the reign of Tokhtamysh, the Khan supported Genoese efforts to defeat the lord of Sorgat, a Crimean warlord.

Relations devolved into hostility during the rule of Jani Beg Khan, who sought to crush Italian (both Genoese and Venetian) power in the region. In 1343, a crisis over residency and trade between Venice and Golden Horde authorities led to joint Genoese-Venetian military action against the horde, blockading Mongol ports. The conflict continued into 1345, when Mongol forces besieged Kaffa. The siege dragged on into 1346, with the Mongol army being unable to capture the city. During the siege, an outbreak of the bubonic plague in the Mongol camp spread to the city, and Kaffa eventually became a route for the spread of the plague into Europe.

== Conflicts in the 15th century ==
In the early 1430s, Tartar nobleman Hacı I Giray - then a vassal of the Golden Horde - invaded Crimea, seizing ports and extracting tribute before being driven off by rival nobles. He returned in 1433, again invading Crimea and seizing Genoese colonies. The Genoese responded by dispatching an army to Crimea, recaptured the republic's colonies before being defeated in battle by Giray near Staryi Krym. Genoa then paid a ransom to Giray and acknowledged him as Khan in exchange for peace, while Giray was forced to flee Crimea in the wake of a Kazanate invasion of Crimea in 1434. Giray returned to Crimea in 1440, again occupying the peninsula and establishing the Crimean Khanate. Two years later, Genoese authorities in Kaffa raised an army, allied themselves with the Golden Horde, and attacked Giray's holdings in Crimea. The khan defeated the Genoese, but lost ground to the Golden Horde and was forced to flee to Perekop, where he withstood a siege by the Golden Horde. Soon after, Giray restored his influence in the Crimean peninsula, invading and driving out the Golden Horde. He then allied himself with the Principality of Theodoro against Genoa and drove the Genoese out of the fortress of Inkerman.

In 1453, an Ottoman fleet arrived in Crimea and attempted to seize the Genoese colonies. Giray allied himself with the Ottomans, providing 7,000 soldiers to assist in an Ottoman siege of Kaffa. Though the allies were unable to break through Kaffa's defenses, the alliance strengthened ties between the Crimean Khanate and Ottoman Empire.

Cut off from its Black Sea colonies by the fall of Constantinople in 1453, Genoa quickly lost influence in the area, after which its colonies were left vulnerable to the expanding Ottoman Empire. Starting in the 1460s, Genoese authorities in Kaffa and Khan Meñli I Giray cooperated in a series of military campaigns, including a failed attempt to capture Chufut-Kale from the Great Horde (a division of the earlier Golden Horde). The khan attempted to form an anti-Turkish pact with Theodoro, but was unable to stop growing Turkish power in Crimea. In 1475, the Ottomans laid siege to Kaffa, capturing the city and Meñli, who had been present in the city during the siege. After the Great Horde invaded and occupied Crimea in 1478, Meñli was released and restored to his throne as a Turkish vassal, the Ottoman Empire having supplanted the Genoese and Mongol states as the primary power in the Black Sea.

== See also ==
- Byzantine–Genoese War (1348–1349)
- Venetian–Genoese Wars
  - First War (1256–1270)
  - Second War (1294–1299)
  - Third War (1350–1355)
  - Fourth War (1378–1381)
