= Cucupha =

Pharmaceutical headgear

In old pharmacy, a cucupha or cucufa was a cap, or cover for the head, with cephalic spices quilted in it, worn for certain nervous distempers, particularly those affecting the head.
