= Gabriel de Mussis =

Italian notary (c. 1280 – c. 1356)

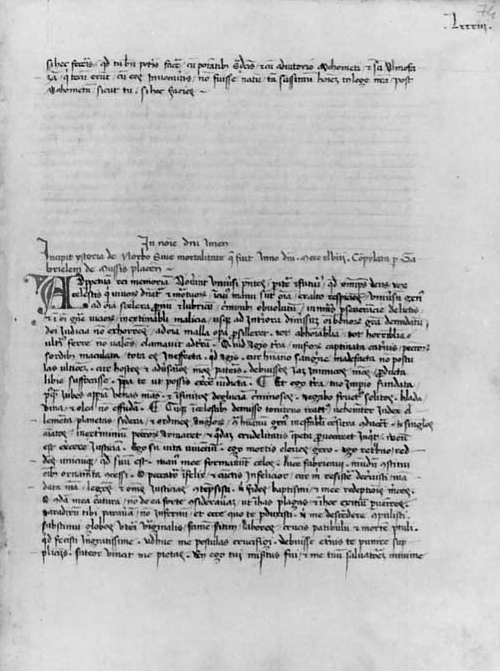
First page of the Istoria

Gabriel de Mussis (Italian: Gabriele de' Mussi; c. 1280 – c. 1356) was a notary from Piacenza, Italy, who gave a vivid account of the start of the Black Death in the Black Sea city of Kaffa and its spread to Sicily and Piacenza. His account in Latin, entitled Istoria de Morbo sive Mortalitate quae fuit Anno Dni MCCCXLVIII ("History of the Disease, or the Great Dying that took place in the Year of our Lord 1348"), is preserved in a manuscript in the library of the University of Wroclaw (now shelfmark R 262).

Although it was formerly believed that de Mussis had been present in Kaffa and travelled in a disease-laden ship to Piacenza, it has been determined that he probably never left home. De Mussis apparently recorded an early example of biological warfare in describing how the army of the Golden Horde hurled plague-infected cadavers over the city walls during the Siege of Caffa in 1346. Modern authorities believe that his description of events is plausible and may indicate that plague was successfully introduced into Kaffa by the Tartars, but that the long-standing belief that the events at Kaffa contributed to the spread of plague beyond the city is not correct. Some scholars such as Jean Paul Zanders however believe that the story of the attack as exaggerated due to factors such as De Mussis only hearing of the attack from others and the limitations of trebuchet capabilities.

== Translated Transcript ==
“…In 1346, in the countries of the East, countless numbers of Tartars and Saracens were struck down by a mysterious illness which brought sudden death. Within these countries broad regions, far-spreading provinces, magnificent kingdoms, cities, towns and settlements, ground down by illness and devoured by dreadful death, were soon stripped of their inhabitants. An eastern settlement under the rule of the Tartars called Tana, which lay to the north of Constantinople and was much frequented by Italian merchants, was totally abandoned after an incident there which led to its being besieged and attacked by hordes of Tartars who gathered in a short space of time. The Christian merchants, who had been driven out by force, were so terrified of the power of the Tartars that, to save themselves and their belongings, they fled in an armed ship to Caffa, a settlement in the same part of the world which had been founded long ago by the Genoese.

“Oh God! See how the heathen Tartar races, pouring together from all sides, suddenly invested the city of Caffa and besieged the trapped Christians there for almost three years. There, hemmed in by an immense army, they could hardly draw breath, although food could be shipped in, which offered them some hope. But behold, the whole army was affected by a disease which overran the Tartars and killed thousands upon thousands every day. It was as though arrows were raining down from heaven to strike and crush the Tartars’ arrogance. All medical advice and attention was useless; the Tartars died as soon as the signs of disease appeared on their bodies: swellings in the armpit or groin caused by coagulating humours, followed by a putrid fever.

“The dying Tartars, stunned and stupefied by the immensity of the disaster brought about by the disease, and realizing that they had no hope of escape, lost interest in the siege. But they ordered corpses to be placed in catapults1 and lobbed into the city in the hope that the intolerable stench would kill everyone inside.2 What seemed like mountains of dead were thrown into the city, and the Christians could not hide or flee or escape from them, although they dumped as many of the bodies as they could in the sea. And soon the rotting corpses tainted the air and poisoned the water supply, and the stench was so overwhelming that hardly one in several thousand was in a position to flee the remains of the Tartar army. Moreover one infected man could carry the poison to others, and infect people and places with the disease by look alone. No one knew, or could discover, a means of defense.

“Thus almost everyone who had been in the East, or in the regions to the south and north, fell victim to sudden death after contracting this pestilential disease, as if struck by a lethal arrow which raised a tumor on their bodies. The scale of the mortality and the form which it took persuaded those who lived, weeping and lamenting, through the bitter events of 1346 to 1348—the Chinese, Indians, Persians, Medes, Kurds, Armenians, Cilicians, Georgians, Mesopotamians, Nubians, Ethiopians, Turks, Egyptians, Arabs, Saracens and Greeks (for almost all the East has been affected)—that the last judgement had come.

“…As it happened, among those who escaped from Caffa by boat were a few sailors who had been infected with the poisonous disease. Some boats were bound for Genoa, others went to Venice and to other Christian areas. When the sailors reached these places and mixed with the people there, it was as if they had brought evil spirits with them: every city, every settlement, every place was poisoned by the contagious pestilence, and their inhabitants, both men and women, died suddenly. And when one person had contracted the illness, he poisoned his whole family even as he fell and died, so that those preparing to bury his body were seized by death in the same way. Thus death entered through the windows, and as cities and towns were depopulated their inhabitants mourned their dead neighbours.”
