= Cronaca fiorentina di Marchionne di Coppo Stefani =

14th-century work on the Black Death in Florence

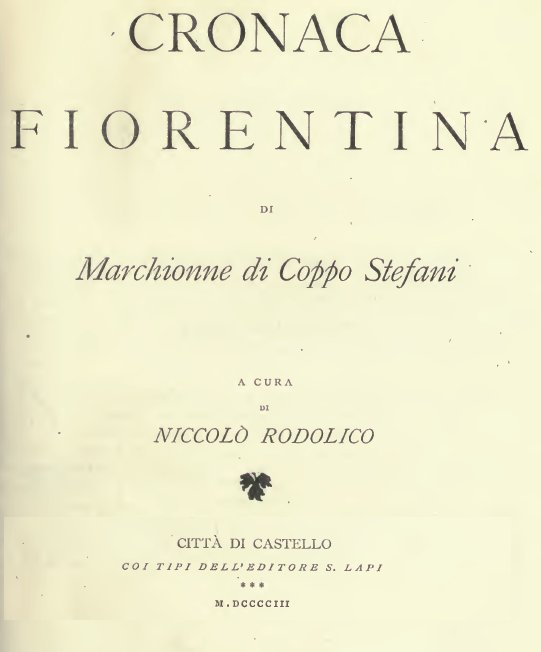
Cronaca fiorentina di Marchionne di Coppo Stefani Title page of Rodolico's edition of 1903

The Cronaca fiorentina di Marchionne di Coppo Stefani (English: Florentine Chronicle of Marchionne di Coppo Stefani) written by Baldassarre Bonaiuti is considered one of the best works written on the Black Death in Florence in the year 1348. It is the only known literary work by Bonaiuti. It was written in vulgar Latin. There is no information as to when he may have started his work, but he devoted much time on it in his retirement from about 1378 until his death, a period of seven years.

The Cronaca fiorentina is not only a detailed history of the Black Death in Florence, but also a history of Florentine political groups and the political ambitions of individuals. Bonaiuti stresses the economic disruption in Florence during the fourteenth century which was the result of the bubonic plague. The Chronicle is a didactic work as well as a detailed historical record of Florence up to 1386.

== Editions ==
The first edition of the chronicle was by Ildefonso di San Luigi (1724–1792), who had available to him four codices of the work. Niccolò Rodolico, in preparing a new edition, was able to refer to a further seven codices, the earliest of which dated from about twenty-five years after Bonaiuti's death. Rodolico's edition was published in 1903.

== Contents ==
On the first page of his Chronicle Bonaiuti declares, of his chosen language and his research:

Whereas those who want to read will see an orderly and systematic history of the past, if they delight in that, so the future can take example from the past, and so that the layman as well as the lettered can take of the fruit of my labors, I write in vulgar Latin ... I put time and care into finding books and other writings ...

The Chronicle gives some of the history of the Bonaiuti family, placing the writer's ancestors at the beginning of the thirteenth century among the noble Guelphs. His Chronicle, however, is mainly about the history of Florence from ancient times (its legendary foundation by Caesar in 70 BCE) up to 1385. Bonaiuti devotes a major part of the work to the destruction caused to Florence and Fiesole by the bubonic plague of the Black Death in the fourteenth century. For the first part of Bonaiuti's work up to 1348 he relied upon Giovanni Villani's Nuova Cronica, but after that he diverges from the work of Villani. His own work focusses principally on Florence, while that of Villani extended over other parts of Europe, with no particular devotion to any geographical area.

Bonaiuti devotes in his Chronicle as much effort to the current "news" of the time, especially concerning the Black Death, as to the ancient history of earlier centuries. His account of Florentine events to 1367 contains little detail. This increases for the years 1368 to 1372, but for 1373-74 detail is again scarce. From 1375 until Bonaiuti's death there is again much detail of the current news events of Florence.

A passage in Bonaiuti's Cronaca fiorentina talks of the mortality rate and the small virtues of people living under such extreme conditions of the plague disease suffered by Florence in 1348. The plague not only killed people, but it killed also their domestic animals, including dogs and cats, and their livestock, such as oxen, donkeys, sheep and chickens. The disease arrived in Florence in March 1348 and did not stop killing until September of that year.

The Cronaca fiorentina explains that physicians of the day had no idea how to fight this deadly plague, as the medicine of the day knew of no defense against it. It caused such terror that even family members abandoned each other. If someone fell sick, his relations would tell him to go to bed, while they could fetch the doctor. But on leaving home they would fail to return. Once a patient was in bed he usually received no further care, not even food or water.

The work also describes the symptoms of the disease, which were a bubo in the groin area or the armpit. This was usually followed by a fever, with the sufferer spitting up saliva or blood. Those spitting up blood never survived, and most with these symptoms would die within a few days. There was such fear of getting the plague just by being near to sick people that their relations abandoned them. Many people died simply by being left alone with no help whatsoever: no medical assistance, nursing, or even food, if they had indicated they were ill. There was nothing to do but to go to bed and die. No one would enter a house that had a plague sufferer in it. People would not even deal with a healthy person if they suspected they came from a house of sickness. No one would enter an abandoned house if those in it had died of the plague. Everything in the house seemed poisoned. Nobody dared touch anything for fear they would contact the plague.

A passage from Bonaiuti's chronicle tells how most churches were overwhelmed with burials, so dug mass deep graves. Those responsible for disposing of the bodies carried them to the mass grave, dropped them in, and added earth. More bodies arrived the next day, upon which more earth was placed, and soon the mass graves were filled with layers of bodies. People willing to carry bodies to the graves were highly paid and were called beccamorti, or vultures. Some made a fortune at the work, if they did not die of the plague themselves.

Bonaiuti recounts how in the months of the Black Death, goods became very expensive. Food prices increased astronomically. Services of all kinds also became very expensive. Wax was very scarce, so that few could afford a pound weight of it. The government of the city finally had to order a limit on the price of wax, so that people could afford candles for light and for the few funerals that took place, but only two candles could be carried in any funeral. The cost of funeral clothing climbed ten-fold. Finally, the custom of dressing in expensive clothing for a funeral was discontinued.

The Cronaca fiorentina explains that the spice-dealers and beccamorti sold burial items, such as perfumed spiced goods, benches, caskets, burial palls, biers, and cushions, at outrageously high prices, so that the government finally had to step in and control such prices. It also forbade the custom of ringing bells during a funeral, to limit the knowledge of how many funerals there actually were. Crying out a funeral announcement was also forbidden. Knowing how many funerals there were discouraged the sick as well as the healthy. Priests and friars served the rich, since they were paid large amounts of money for their services, and could become rich themselves. The local authorities then made laws prescribing how many clerics a church could have, usually setting the limit at six. Many rich people died, and many religious processions with relics went through the streets of Florence. The dead would be carried away by four beccamorti and a tonsured clerk carrying a Christian cross, each wanting to be highly paid.

Bonaiuti makes it clear that the plague killed so many people that certain new customs were put into place. Fruits with a nut center, unhusked almonds, figs, and "unhealthy" fruits were forbidden to enter Florence, for fear of bringing in the pestilence. Men would gather and dine together. Each evening a man would provide the cooked meal for ten other men, rotating from night to night as the host. Many times a host would provide dinner for ten, but two or three were missing. Often by the next evening only one of the ten was still present, the other nine having died or having fled the city for villages outside it, to get fresh air, but they took the plague with them and contaminated otherwise healthy villages. Thus the pestilence spread, killing people at an ever faster rate.

The Cronaca fiorentina also explains that the Florentine guilds were not operating during the plague epidemic of the fourteenth century. The craft shops were closed, as were the taverns, and only the apothecaries and the churches remained open for business during the disaster. The overcharging for certain goods and services shows the morality of those providing them, and the rate at which the plague killed people made the apothecaries and doctors rich. Others enriched by the high death rate were poultry-farmers, gravediggers, grocers selling vegetables, and those who made poultices to draw away the infirmity of the disease.

== Sources ==
- Avery, Catherine B., The New Century Italian Renaissance encyclopedia, Appleton-Century-Crofts, 1972
- Ragone, Franca, Giovanni Villani e i suoi continuatori. La scrittura delle cronache a Firenze nel Trecento ('Giovanni Villani and those who came after him. Writing the news in fourteenth-century Florence') Rome, 1998.
- Palmarocchi, R., Cronisti del Trecento, Milan-Rome, 1935, pp. 647–652
