= Agnolo di Tura =

14th-century Sienese chronicler

Agnolo di Tura (14th century) was a chronicler from Siena, Italy. He was also a shoemaker and tax collector. He married a woman named Nicoluccia, who was of a higher class than he was. He was the editor of Andrea Dei's Cronica Sanese from the years 1329 to 1351, where he mainly recorded domestic memories. Together, Agnolo and Nicoluccia had five children. During the time of the Black Death which arrived in Siena in May 1348, Nicoluccia and all five children died. Agnolo di Tura survived the Black Death and remarried.

As a survivor of the Black Plague, he wrote:

The mortality in Siena began in May. It was a cruel and horrible thing. ... It seemed that almost everyone became stupefied seeing the pain. It is impossible for the human tongue to recount the awful truth. Indeed, one who did not see such horribleness can be called blessed. The victims died almost immediately. They would swell beneath the armpits and in the groin, and fall over while talking. Father abandoned child, wife husband, one brother another; for this illness seemed to strike through breath and sight. And so they died. None could be found to bury the dead for money or friendship. Members of a household brought their dead to a ditch as best they could, without priest, without divine offices. In many places in Siena great pits were dug and piled deep with the multitude of dead. And they died by the hundreds, both day and night, and all were thrown in those ditches and covered with earth. And as soon as those ditches were filled, more were dug. I, Agnolo di Tura ... buried my five children with my own hands. ... And so many died that all believed it was the end of the world.

— Agnolo di Tura

== Resources ==
- Book
- Book
- Course
- Plaque
- History
