= Siege of Caffa =

Medieval siege

- Part of the Genoese–Mongol Wars
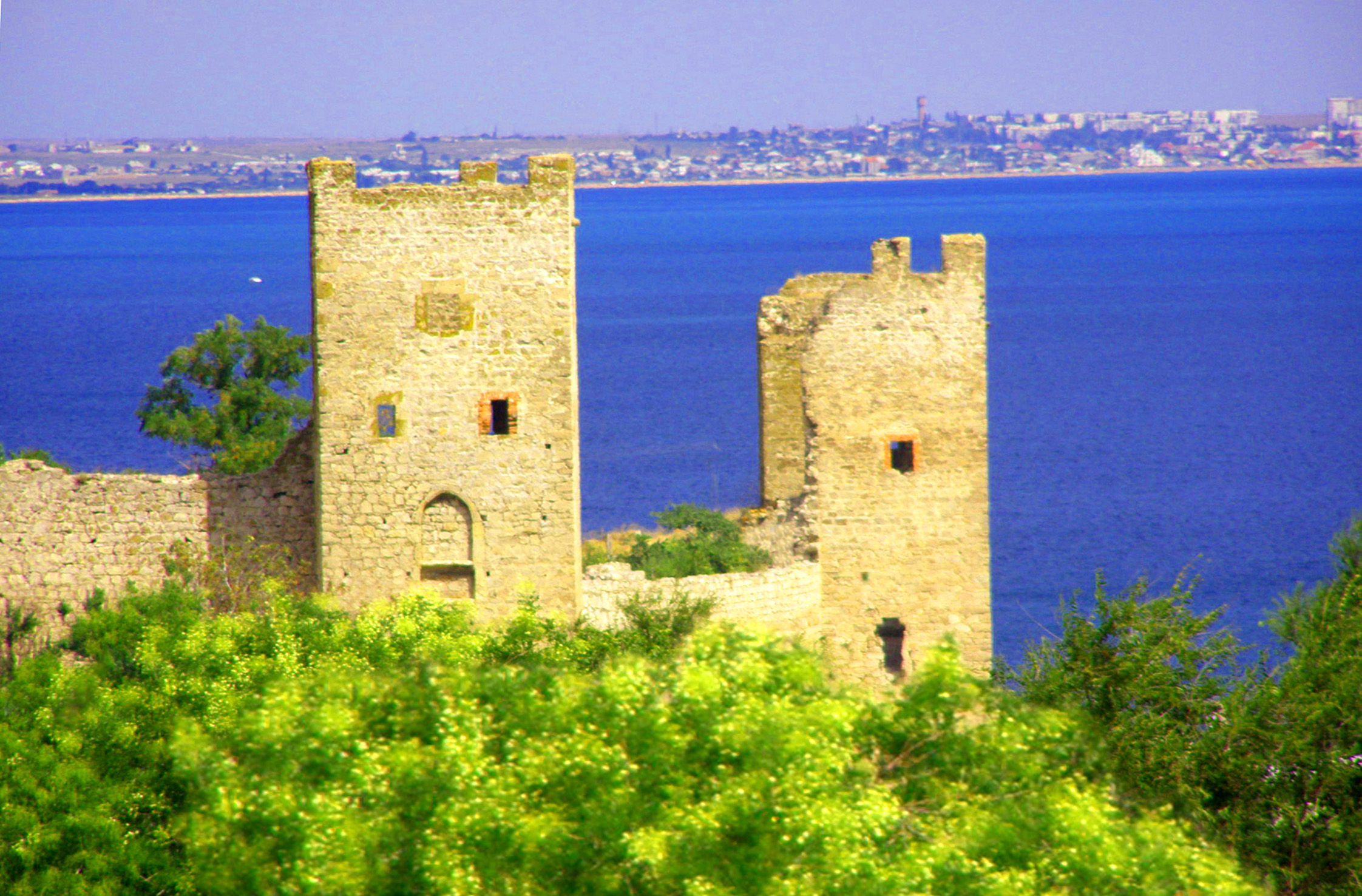
- The remains of a Genoese fortress in Feodosia
| Date | 1343–1344, 1345–1347 |
| Location | Caffa, Crimea 45.02°N 35.22°E |
| Result | Defenders' victory; siege lifted. |
| Territorial changes | Colony of Tana re-established. |

Belligerents
| Republic of Genoa; Republic of Venice | Golden Horde |

Commanders and leaders
| Simone Boccanegra (Note: As the 1st Doge of the Republic of Genoa) (1345); Giovanni I di Murta (Note: As the 2nd Doge of the Republic of Genoa) (1345–47) | Jani Beg (Note: As the Khan of the Golden Horde) |

Strength
| Several thousand | Several thousand |

Casualties and losses
| Several thousand | 15,000 men |

The siege of Caffa was a 14th-century military encounter when Jani Beg of the Golden Horde besieged the city of Caffa (modern-day Feodosia), between two periods in the 1340s. The city of Caffa, a Genoese colony, was a vital trading hub located in Crimea. The city was then part of Gazaria, a group of seven ports located in Crimea and belonging to the maritime empire of the Republic of Genoa. The event is historically significant primarily because it is believed to be one of the earliest instances of biological warfare.

The siege of Caffa was characterized by intense military tactics from both sides. After several years of siege, the armies of the Horde were forced to withdraw. The siege is famous for a story recounted by Italian notary Gabriel de Mussis, which attributed the subsequent spread of the Black Death to plague-infested corpses having been launched over the walls at the end of the siege.

== Background ==
Caffa (modern-day Feodosia) was a thriving port city on the Crimean Peninsula, established by Genoese merchants in 1266 by a purchase agreement with the Khan of the Golden Horde. The city was strategically situated on the Black Sea, serving as a critical link in the trade routes between Europe and Asia. Caffa's prosperity made it a coveted target for various powers, including the Mongol Empire. The Mongols, under the leadership of the Golden Horde, sought to control this lucrative trading post, which was vital for the flow of goods such as spices, silk, and precious metals.

Relations between the Genoese and the Mongol Golden Horde were strained. The khan of the Golden Horde, Toqta, was piqued at the Italian slave trade in Turkic slaves via the Black Sea, who were sold as soldiers to military slavery in the Mamluk Sultanate. He arrested the Italian residents of Sarai (the Mongol capital), and besieged Caffa, which the Genoese resisted for a year, but in 1308 set fire to their city and abandoned it. Relations between the Italians and the Golden Horde remained tense until Toqta's death in 1312.

Toqtai's successor, Özbeg Khan, mended relations with the Genoese, which allowed Caffa to become a thriving city once again by the 1340s. However, the ascension of Özbeg Khan's son Jani Beg to the throne changed the political scene once more. The conversion of the Golden Horde Khans to Islam led to the Genovese assuming that , like their persecution of Muslims, the new Muslim converts would persecute Christians. This stems from the fact Genoa provided naval support to Spanish Christian kingdoms, actively bombarding and capturing Islamic Taifa ports such as Almería (1147) and Tortosa (1148), looting the cities and capturing their populations (see The making of a crusade: the Genoese anti-Muslim attacks in Spain, 1146–1148 by John Bryan Williams in the Journal of Medieval History 23 (1), 29-53, 1997).

The relationship between the Genoese and the Mongol Golden Horde was complex, marked by periods of cooperation and conflict. The Genoese had initially secured their trading rights through treaties with the Mongols, but tensions arose due to competing interests and the volatile political landscape of the region. The escalation of these tensions ultimately led to the siege of Caffa in 1346.

== Siege ==
The Mongols under Jani Beg besieged Caffa in 1343 and the Venetian territory of Tana, the cause of which was a brawl between Italians and Muslims in Tana. The siege of Caffa lasted until February 1344, when it was lifted after an Italian relief force killed 15,000 Mongol troops and destroyed their siege machines.

Jani Beg renewed the siege in 1345 and cut off any supplies to the city, leading to miserable conditions within Caffa. The siege was a prolonged and grueling affair, lasting several months. The Mongol army, renowned for their military prowess and tactics, faced a formidable challenge in Caffa's strong fortifications. The city's defenses were well-maintained, and the Genoese defenders were determined to hold their ground.

The Mongols employed various siege tactics, including direct assaults, bombardments, and attempts to breach the walls with siege engines. However, the Genoese, bolstered by their strategic fortifications and the ability to receive supplies by sea, managed to hold off the Mongol attacks. The stalemate continued for months, with both sides suffering significant casualties and struggling to maintain their positions.

The turning point in the siege came when an outbreak of the plague struck the Mongol camp. The disease, which later became known as the Black Death, caused widespread devastation among the Mongol troops. The exact origins of the plague in the Mongol camp are unclear, but it is believed to have been brought by infected rodents and fleas that thrived in the unsanitary conditions of the encampment. The epidemic of bubonic plague devastated Jani Beg's forces, giving hope to the Italians, and he was forced to lift the siege in 1347. The siege and despair of the city's citizens as the disease spread is vividly described by the Italian notary Gabriel de Mussis. However, de Mussis was not present at the siege and his story is contradicted by contemporary evidence from the Black Sea region. It is now believed that the Black Death spread to Europe in grain shipments that were restarted after the wartime embargoes between Venetian, Genoan, and Golden Horde merchants had been lifted.

The Italians blockaded Mongol ports, forcing Jani Beg to negotiate for peace, and they were allowed to reestablish their colony in Tana in 1347. The resolution of the siege marked a temporary restoration of stability in the region, but also emphasize the broader consequences of the conflict and the bubonic plague.

== Historicity of Biological warfare Account ==
A much replicated story about the genesis of the plague in Caffa is that the Mongol forces decided to use the bodies of their plague-infected soldiers as weapons. This story stems from a single account by Gabriel de Mussis, who chronicled the Black Death in his work Istoria de Morbo. The Istoria is the only contemporary source that mentions the Mongols catapulting bodies into the besieged city of Caffa. Early historians assumed de Mussis's account was written in the first-person from direct experience. Later scholars looked into the archive of documents at the Basilica di Sant'Antonino in Piacenza, where they found that de Mussis notarized many documents between 1344 and 1356. Thus, the Istoria is not a first-person account, as de Mussi never left Piacenza between 1344-1356. Instead, he wrote his account after the plague spread to Genoa, late 1347 or 1348. The result is that "overreliance on Mussi's treatise has misled scholars about the geography, chronology and human intentions behind early plague transmission".

Other scholars have questioned the usefulness and feasibility of catapulting plague bodies into a walled city. The disease most likely moved into the city from the harborside, as the supply ships supporting the besieged city were already infected. Caffa was surrounded by Yersinia Pestis on all sides. The disease spread rapidly among the inhabitants, causing panic, death, and chaos. The Genoese defenders, unable to contain the outbreak, were forced to abandon their positions and flee the city.

== Aftermath ==
The fleeing Genoese survivors boarded ships in a desperate attempt to escape the plague-ridden city. Unknown to them, they were carrying the plague with them, setting the stage for the pandemic's spread to Europe. As these ships docked at various ports along the Mediterranean, the Black Death began to take hold in Europe, leading to one of the deadliest pandemics in history.

The spread of the plague from Caffa to Europe had catastrophic consequences. The Black Death is estimated to have killed between 30% and 60% of Europe's population over the next few years. The pandemic caused massive social, economic, and political upheaval, altering the course of European history. The rapid and widespread transmission of the disease demonstrated the vulnerability of interconnected trade networks to the spread of infectious diseases.
