= Black Death in Poland =

14th-century pandemic

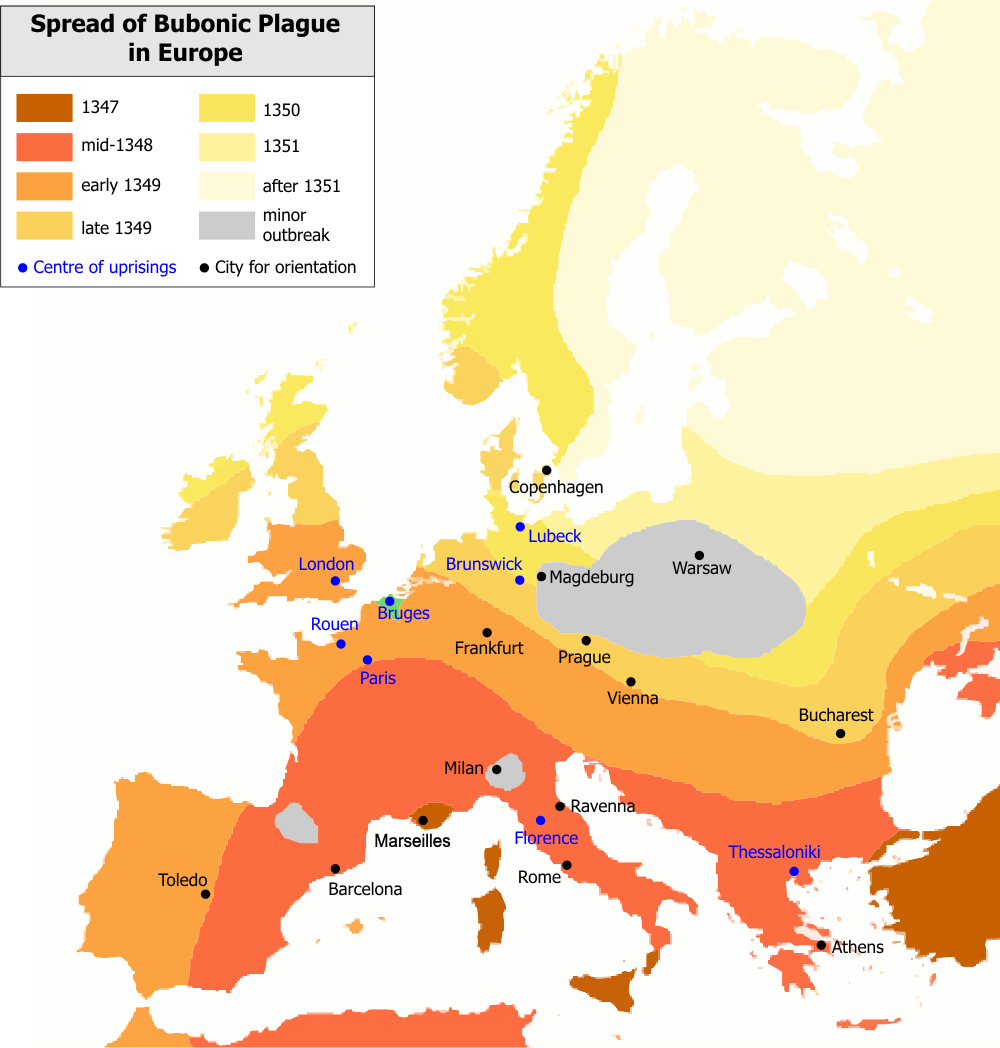
Map of the spread of Black Death in Europe. Note the lack of spread portrayed in Poland (mostly coloured in grey).

The Black Death (Polish: Czarna śmierć), a major bubonic plague pandemic, is believed to have spread to Poland in 1351. The region, along with the northern Pyrenees and Milan, is often believed to have been minimally affected by the disease compared to other regions of Europe.

== Background ==
=== Poland in the mid-14th century ===
During the mid-14th century, the Kingdom of Poland was ruled by Casimir III the Great. This period was largely marked by military and legal reform, extensive Jewish migration, and eastern expansion into Galicia–Volhynia. Previously in a weakened state, the reign of Casimir III largely allowed Poland to prosper during a time of relative instability and hardship for the rest of the continent.

=== Black Death ===
It is traditionally believed that the Black Death spread into Europe via Genoese traders in their Black Sea port of Kaffa in the year 1347. As the story goes, Golden Horde troops besieging the city catapulted diseased carcasses into the walls of the city in an act of early biological warfare. This then spread into the city of Genoa itself from fleeing ships, and then throughout Italy where it gained a foothold into Europe.

== Spread ==
During the Black Death, the Kingdom of Poland was a landlocked country, largely surrounded by plague-infected areas. Though disputed, the country's lack of depopulation was largely evidenced in a 2019 study, citing the stable amount of cereal grain pollen in the region. Dr Piotr Guzowski of the University of Bialystok noted "In the cores we have analyzed so far, no significant decreases in the share of pollen of cereals, weeds or other plants related to human activity are recorded, which means that there was no depopulation."

== Impact on Jews ==
The spread of the Black Death had a large impact on Polish society, particularly demographically. Many Jews in Europe were discriminated against during this period as they were blamed for the plague's spread. With existing large Jewish communities within Poland's borders, particularly in Poznań and Kraków, Casimir III the Great at the time welcomed an influx of Jews into this population, encouraging this settlement and even giving them personal protection as "people of the king". This largely bolstered existing Jewish communities and greatly increased their numbers, to a point where for centuries afterwards Poland was home to the largest Jewish community in the world (see Golden Age of Jews in Poland).

Jews in Poland may have contributed to resistance to the disease. Jews brought religious practices of hygienics, in particular handwashing in a practice known as נטילת ידיים (netilat yadayim) which was not only encouraged but mandatory for members of the faith. During the close of Casimir's reign, attitudes towards Jews in Poland soured. Blood libel against Jews became a growing phenomenon and initial tolerance was disturbed, although interfaith relations were still fairly tame compared to other European nations. The first pogrom in Poland was recorded in the city of Poznań during 1367, near the end of the Black Death.

== Explanation for lack of spread ==
There have been various explanations for the plague's apparent lack of spread in Poland.

Casimir III the Great, who was the King of Poland during the period, reportedly at the time banned all travel into Poland from other nations, which may have impacted its spread. However, a ban would have been difficult to enforce, especially during the period. The law mostly applied to major individual cities, specifically walled cities, while in the countryside many could still come and go as they pleased.

One theory via French historians Stéphane Barry and Norbert Gualde suggests that, within the Kingdom of Poland, there was a variety of resistant blood groups in the Polish population that helped to reduce the spread. However, this is largely disproved by various subsequent resurgences of the plague in the region, such as during the Great Northern War plague outbreak. During the start of the COVID-19 pandemic in Poland, some Poles had optimistically embraced this theory and referenced Poland's prior resistance to the bubonic plague outbreak.

Poland's geographic location was likely a factor in the regional outcome. The Carpathian Mountains, at the time a part of the Polish borderland, could have lessened the impact of the plague. (Existing mountain ranges, such as the Himalayas, are believed instrumental in preventing the bubonic plague's spread into India.) This, coupled with Poland's already relatively sparse population, may have helped to lessen the impact in the region. However, Poland's border with the Holy Roman Empire, the northern reaches of which were actively ridden with the plague, was not shielded by the mountains.

=== Opposing claims ===
It is widely disputed how much effect the plague had on Poland. Neighboring cities with frequent Polish trade, such as Vienna, as well as the Hanseatic League, were known to spread disease widely through their trading partners along busy shipping routes. Poland was particularly engaged in trade during this era, especially through the Hanseatic League, making it unusual and unlikely the plague had as little of an effect on Poland as believed. Certain historians believe this to be a discrepancy.

A popular belief is that the argument that Poland was resistant to the plague comes from a lack of statistics attributed to Communist rule in Poland during the 20th century. A proponent of this is Norwegian Black Death expert Ole Jørgen Benedictow, who claims in his book The Black Death 1346–1353: The Complete History, "Communist authorities and ideological watchdogs prevented serious research on the Black Death and the following plague epidemics, suspecting (correctly) that this study could establish disturbing alternative demographic views to Marxist orthodoxy on important historical developments in the Late Middle Ages."

Other evidence against Polish omission from the plague includes societal changes often associated with the plague. In particular, during the second half of the fourteenth century, changes included the increase in the size of Polish forests, the increase in wages in Kraków, and the collapse of grain prices. These societal changes are widely attributed to the demographic shifts resulting from the Black Death and were documented in both Poland and other European countries.

== See also ==
- Globalization and disease
- Medieval demography
- Crisis of the Late Middle Ages
- List of epidemics
