= Black Death in England =

14th-century bubonic plague pandemic

The Black Death was a bubonic plague pandemic, which reached England in June 1348. It was the first and most severe manifestation of the second pandemic, caused by Yersinia pestis bacteria. The term Black Death was not used until the late 17th century.

Originating in Asia, it spread west along the trade routes across Europe and arrived on the British Isles from the English province of Gascony. The plague was spread by flea-infected rats, as well as individuals who had been infected on the continent. Rats were the reservoir hosts of the Y. pestis bacteria and the Oriental rat flea was the primary vector.

The first-known case in England was a seaman who arrived at Weymouth, Dorset, from Gascony in June 1348. By autumn, the plague had reached London, and by summer 1349 it covered the entire country, before dying down by December. Low estimates of mortality in the early 20th century have been revised upwards due to re-examination of data and new information, and a figure of 40–60% of the population is widely accepted.

The most immediate consequence was a halt to the campaigns of the Hundred Years' War. In the long term, the decrease in population caused a shortage of labour, with subsequent rise in wages, resisted by the landowners, which caused deep resentment among the lower classes. The Peasants' Revolt of 1381 was largely a result of this resentment, and even though the rebellion was suppressed, in the long term serfdom was ended in England. The Black Death also affected artistic and cultural efforts, and may have helped advance the use of the vernacular.

In 1361–1362 the plague returned to England, this time causing the death of around 20% of the population. After this the plague continued to return intermittently throughout the 14th and 15th centuries, in local or national outbreaks. From this point its effect became less severe, and one of the last outbreaks of the plague in England was the Great Plague of London in 1665–1666.

== Background ==
=== England in the mid-14th century ===
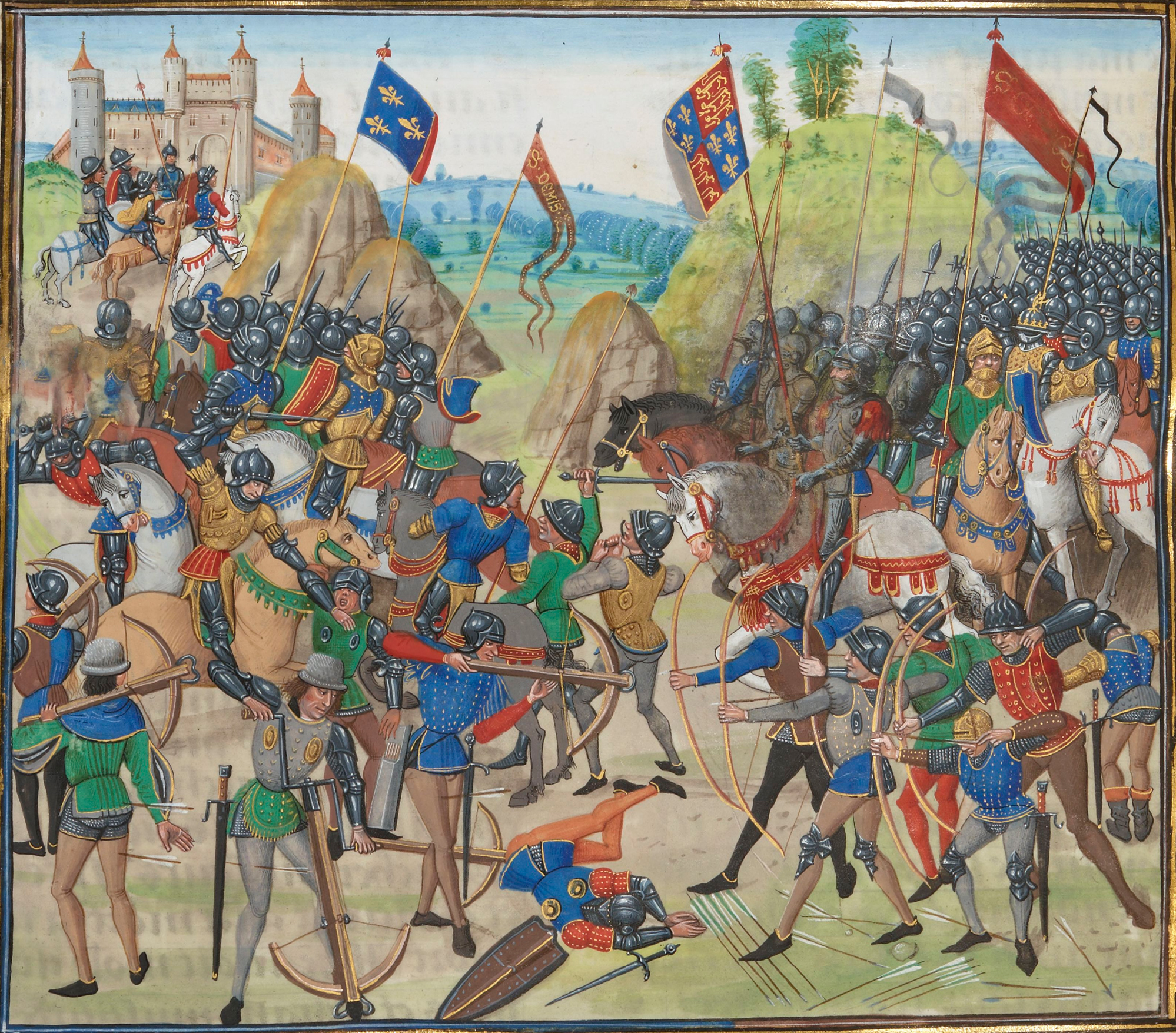
The Battle of Crécy established England as a military power.

It is impossible to establish with any certainty the exact number of inhabitants in England at the eve of the Black Death, and estimates range from 3 to 7 million. The number is probably at the higher end, and an estimate of around 6 million inhabitants seems plausible. Earlier demographic crises—in particular the Great Famine of 1315–1317—had resulted in great numbers of deaths, but there is no evidence of any significant decrease in the population prior to 1348. England was still a predominantly rural and agrarian society; close to 90 per cent of the population lived in the countryside. Of the major cities, London was in a class of its own, with perhaps as many as 70,000 inhabitants. Further down the scale were Norwich, with around 12,000 people, and York with around 10,000. The main export, and the source of the nation's wealth, was wool. Until the middle of the century the export had consisted primarily of raw wool to cloth makers in Flanders. Gradually though, the technology for cloth making used on the Continent was appropriated by English manufacturers, who started an export of cloths around mid-century that would boom over the following decades.

Politically, the kingdom was evolving into a major European power, through the youthful and energetic kingship of Edward III. In 1346, the English had won a decisive battle over the Scots at the Battle of Neville's Cross, and it seemed that Edward III would realise his grandfather Edward I's ambition of bringing the Scots under the suzerainty of the English crown. The English were also achieving military success on the Continent. Less than two months before the Battle of Neville's Cross, a numerically inferior English army led by the king himself won a spectacular victory over the French royal forces at the Battle of Crécy. The victory was immediately followed by Edward laying siege to the port city of Calais. When the city fell the next year, this provided the English with a strategically important enclave that would remain in their possession for over two centuries.

=== The Black Death ===
The term "Black Death"—which refers to the first and most serious outbreak of the second pandemic—was not used by contemporaries, who preferred such names as the "Great Pestilence" or the "Great Mortality". It was not until the 17th century that the term under which we know the outbreak today became common, probably derived from Scandinavian languages. It is generally agreed today that the disease in question was plague, caused by Yersinia pestis bacteria. These bacteria are carried by fleas, which can be transferred to humans through contact with rats. Flea bites carry the disease into the lymphatic system, through which it makes its way to the lymph nodes. Here the bacteria multiply and form swellings called buboes, from which the term bubonic plague is derived. After three or four days the bacteria enter the bloodstream, and infect organs such as the spleen and the lungs. The patient will then normally die after a few days. A different strain of the disease is pneumonic plague, where the bacteria become airborne and enter directly into the patient's lungs. This strain is far more virulent, as it spreads directly from person to person. These types of infection probably both played a significant part in the Black Death, while a third strain was more rare. This is the septicaemic plague, where the flea bite carries the bacteria directly into the blood stream, and death occurs very rapidly.

A study reported in 2011 of skeletons exhumed from the Black Death cemetery in East Smithfield, London, found Yersinia pestis DNA. An archaeological dig in the vicinity of Thornton Abbey in Lincolnshire was reported in the science section of The Guardian for 30 November 2016, not only confirming evidence of the Y. pestis DNA in the human remains exhumed there but also dating the remains to mid-1349.

Genotyping showed that it was [at that time] a newly evolved strain, ancestor of all modern strains and proved the Black Death was bubonic plague. Modern medical knowledge suggests that because it was a new strain, the human immune system would have had little or no defence against it, helping to explain the plague's virulence and high death rates.

The Black Death seems to have originated in Central Asia, where the Y. pestis bacterium is endemic in the rodent population. It is unknown exactly what caused the outbreak, but a series of natural occurrences likely brought humans into contact with the infected rodents. The epidemic reached Constantinople in the late spring of 1347, through Genoese merchants trading in the Black Sea. From here it reached Sicily in October that same year, and by early 1348 it had spread over the entire Italian mainland. It spread rapidly through France, and had reached as far north as Paris by June 1348. Moving simultaneously westward, it arrived in the English province of Gascony around the same time.

== Progress of the plague ==
In this year, in Melcombe, in the county of Dorset, a little before the Feast of St. John the Baptist, two ships, one of them from Bristol, came alongside. One of the sailors had brought with him from Gascony the seeds of the terrible pestilence and through him the men of the town of Melcombe were the first in England to be infected.

— Grey Friars' Chronicle

According to the chronicle of the grey friars at King's Lynn, the plague arrived by ship from Gascony to Melcombe (Weymouth) shortly before the Feast of St. John the Baptist on 24 June 1348. Other sources mention different points of arrival, including Bristol and Southampton. Though the plague might have arrived independently at Bristol later, the Grey Friars' Chronicle is considered the most authoritative account. If it is assumed that the chronicle reports the first outbreak of the plague, rather than its actual arrival, then the arrival most likely happened around 8 May.

From Weymouth the disease spread rapidly across the south-west. The first major city to be struck was Bristol. The disease reached London in the autumn of 1348, before most of the surrounding countryside. This had certainly happened by November, though according to some accounts as early as 29 September (Michaelmas). It travelled to London by three principal routes: overland from Weymouth, through Salisbury and Winchester; overland from Gloucester; and along the coast by ship. The full effect of the plague was felt in the capital early the next year. Conditions in London were ideal for the plague: the streets were narrow and flowing with sewage, and houses were overcrowded and poorly ventilated. By March 1349 the disease was spreading haphazardly across all of southern England.

During the first half of 1349 the Black Death spread northwards. A second front opened up when the plague arrived by ship at the Humber, after which it spread both south and north. In May it reached York, and during the summer months of June, July and August, it ravaged the north. Certain northern counties, like Durham and Cumberland, had been the victim of violent incursions from the Scots, and were therefore left particularly vulnerable to the devastations of the plague. Pestilence is less virulent during the winter months, and spreads less rapidly. The Black Death in England had survived the winter of 1348–49, but during the following winter it subsided, and by December 1349 conditions were returning to relative normality. It had taken the disease around 500 days to traverse the entire country.

== Medical practice ==
Various methods of treatment were used, including sweating, bloodletting, and forced vomiting and urinating. Symptoms of the illness included blotches, hardening of the glands under the groin and underarms, and dementia. During the initial phase of the disease, bloodletting was performed on the same side where the physical manifestations of the buboes or risings appeared. For instance, if a rising appeared on the right side of the groin the physician would bleed a vein in the ankle on the same side. To provoke sweating, medicines such as Mithridate, Venice-Treacle, Matthiolus, Bezoar-Water, Serpentary Roots and Electuarium de Ovo were used. Sweating was used when measures were desperate; if a patient had tokens, a severe version of risings, the physician would wrap the naked patient in a blanket drenched in cold water. This was only done while the patient still had natural heat in his system. The desired effect was to make the patient sweat violently and thus purge all corruption from the blood which was caused by the disease.

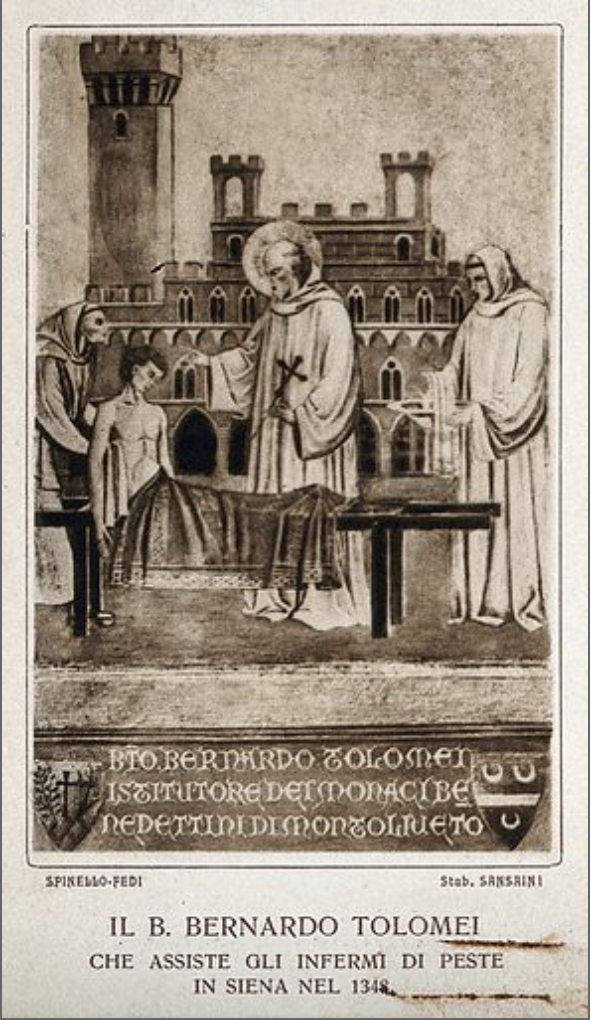
Saint Bernardus Ptolomeus (middle) is comforting an individual sick with the Bubonic Plague (left). A doctor is behind the patient (far left), and an unknown figure is on the right. Though this image is depicting what is currently Siena, Italy during the Black Death, the central idea of a doctor having a Saint (more regularly a priest) connects to actions doctors took in England also.

Oftentimes, the treatment of the Bubonic or Pneumonic plagues in England depended on the treating physician's belief on the cause. During the pinnacle times of the Black Death (1348-1350), many European Christians believed the origin of the Plague was from God. They believed the Plague was sent for punishment of sins as in the Bible "Egypt received seven plagues in the Book of Exodus, in 2 Samuel 24, David punished his people with a Plague for carrying out a divinely forbidden census, and in 1 Samuel 5, those who stole the Ark of the Covenant were struck with painful swellings, similar to buboes". These buboes (swollen lymphnodes often found in the armpit, groin, or neck) were among the most common and painful symptoms of the English and worldwide epidemic, and were so similar in description to those in the bible that many doctors began to believe in religious causes of the plague than previously. With this said, oftentimes if physicians believed the plague was sent by God as a punishment for sin, they would not treat the patient with traditional medical procedures at all. Instead, the physician would put the patient through confession of sins or prayer in hopes that God would stop the suffering.

On a different note, if physicians believed the cause of the plague in their patient was breathing in bad air, one way treatment would be addressed was through having the patient smell strong-smelled herbs. Examples of these herbs include certain types sweet-smelling flowers. Additionally, lighting a fire and having the patient smell the smoke was a method of treatment.

Another practice was the use of pigeons when treating swellings. Swellings which were white in appearance and deep were unlikely to break, and were anointed with Oil of Lillies or Camomil. Once the swelling rose to a head and was red in appearance and not deep in the flesh, it was broken with the use of a feather from a young pigeon's tail. The feather's fundament was held to the swelling to try to draw out the venom. However, if the swelling dropped and became black in appearance, the physician had to be cautious when drawing the cold from the swelling. If it was too late to prevent, the physician would take the young pigeon, cut it open from breast to back, break it open and apply the pigeon (while still alive) over the cold swelling. The cupping therapy was an alternative method which was heated and then placed over the swellings. Once the sore was broken, the physician would apply Mellilot Plaister with Linimentum Arcei and heal the sore with digence.

== Victims ==
=== Death toll ===
Although historical records for England were more extensive than those of any other European country, it is still extremely difficult to establish the death toll with any degree of certainty. Difficulties include uncertainty about the size of the total population, as described above, but also uncertainty about the proportion of the population that died from the plague. Contemporary accounts are often grossly inflated, stating numbers as high as 90%.

The pioneering work in the field was made by Josiah William Russell in his 1948 British Medieval Population. Russell looked at inquisitions post mortem (IPMs)—taken by the Crown to assess the wealth of the greatest landowners after their death—to assess the mortality caused by the Black Death, and from this he arrived at an estimate of 23.6% of the entire population. He also looked at episcopal registers for the death toll among the clergy, where the result was between 30 and 40%. Russell believed the clergy was at particular risk of contagion, and eventually arrived at an overall mortality rate of "only" 20 per cent.

Several of Russell's assumptions have been challenged, and the tendency since has been to adjust the assessment upwards. Philip Ziegler, in 1969, estimated the death rate to have been around one third of the population. Jeremy Goldberg, in 1996, believed a number closer to 45 per cent would be more realistic. A 2004 study by Ole Jørgen Benedictow suggests the exceptionally high mortality level of 62.5 per cent. Assuming a population of 6 million, this estimate would correspond to 3,750,000 deaths. Such a high percentage would place England above the average that Benedictow estimates for Western Europe as a whole, of 60 per cent. Many historians have not accepted such a high death rate.

In 2016, Carenza Lewis reported the results of a new method of assessing the death toll. She argued that pottery before and after the Black Death is datable because there was a change at that time from the high medieval to the late medieval style, and that counts of pottery of each type therefore provide a useful proxy for long term changes in population. She and her colleagues analysed pottery shards from test pits in more than 50 continuously occupied rural settlements in eastern England, and found a decline in the number of pottery producing pits of 45 per cent. Norfolk had the greatest drop of 65 per cent, while there was no drop in 10 per cent of settlements, mostly commercial centres.

==== Impact of the Black Death: 1349 ====
Archbishop Zouche of York issued a warning throughout the diocese in July 1348 (when the epidemic was raging further south) of "great mortalities, pestilences and infections of the air".

The Great Mortality, as it was then known, entered Yorkshire around February 1349 and quickly spread through the diocese. The clergy were on the front line of the disease, bringing comfort to the dying, hearing final confessions and organising burials. This, almost by necessity, put them at a greater risk of infection.

Estimates suggest that the death rate of clergy in some parts of the archdiocese could have been as high as 48 per cent. This is reflected in the Ordination Register, which shows a massive rise in ordained clergy over the period—some being recruited before the arrival of plague in a clerical recruitment drive, but many once plague had arrived, replacing those who had been killed. In 1346, 111 priests and 337 acolytes were recruited. In 1349, 299 priests and 683 acolytes are named, with 166 priests being ordained in one session alone in February 1350."

=== Social distribution ===
Russell had trusted the IPMs to give a true picture of the national average, because he assumed death rates to be relatively equal across the social spectrum. This assumption has been proven wrong, and studies of peasant plague mortality from manor rolls have returned much higher rates. This could be a consequence of the elite's ability to avoid infection by escaping plague-infected areas. It could also result from lower post-infection mortality among those more affluent, due to better access to care and nursing. If so, this would also mean that the mortality rates for the clergy—who were normally better off than the general population—were no higher than the average.

...destructive Death (who seizes young and old alike, sparing no one and reducing rich and poor to the same level) has lamentably snatched from both of us our dearest daughter, (whom we loved best of all, as her virtues demanded).

— Edward III in a letter to King Alfonso of Castile

The manorial records offer a good opportunity to study the geographical distribution of the plague. Its effect seems to have been about the same all over England, though areas like East Anglia, which had frequent contact with the Continent, were severely affected. On a local level, however, there were great variations. A study of the Bishop of Worcester's estates reveals that, while his manors of Hartlebury and Hanbury had a mortality rate of only 19 per cent, the manor of Aston lost as much as 80 per cent of its population. The manor rolls are less useful for studying the demographic distribution of the mortality, since the rolls only record the heads of households, normally an adult male. Here the IPMs show us that the most vulnerable to the disease were infants and the elderly.

There seem to have been relatively few deaths from the Black Death at higher levels of society. The only member of the royal family who can be said with any certainty to have died from the Black Death was in France at the time of her infection. Edward III's daughter Joan was residing in Bordeaux on her way to marry Pedro of Castile in the summer of 1348. When the plague broke out in her household she was moved to a small village nearby, but she could not avoid infection, and died there on 2 September. It is possible that the popular religious author Richard Rolle, who died on 30 September 1349, was another victim of the Black Death. The English philosopher William of Ockham has been mentioned as a plague victim. This, however, is an impossibility. Ockham was living in Munich at the time of his death, on 10 April 1347, two years before the Black Death reached that city.

== Consequences ==
=== Economic, social and political effects ===
Among the most immediate consequences of the Black Death in England was a shortage of farm labour, and a corresponding rise in wages. The medieval world-view was unable to interpret these changes in terms of socio-economic development, and it became common to blame degrading morals instead. The landowning classes saw the rise in wage levels as a sign of social upheaval and insubordination, and reacted with coercion. In 1349, King Edward III passed the Ordinance of Labourers, fixing wages at pre-plague levels. The ordinance was reinforced by Parliament's passing of the Statute of Labourers in 1351. The labour laws were enforced with ruthless determination over the following decades.

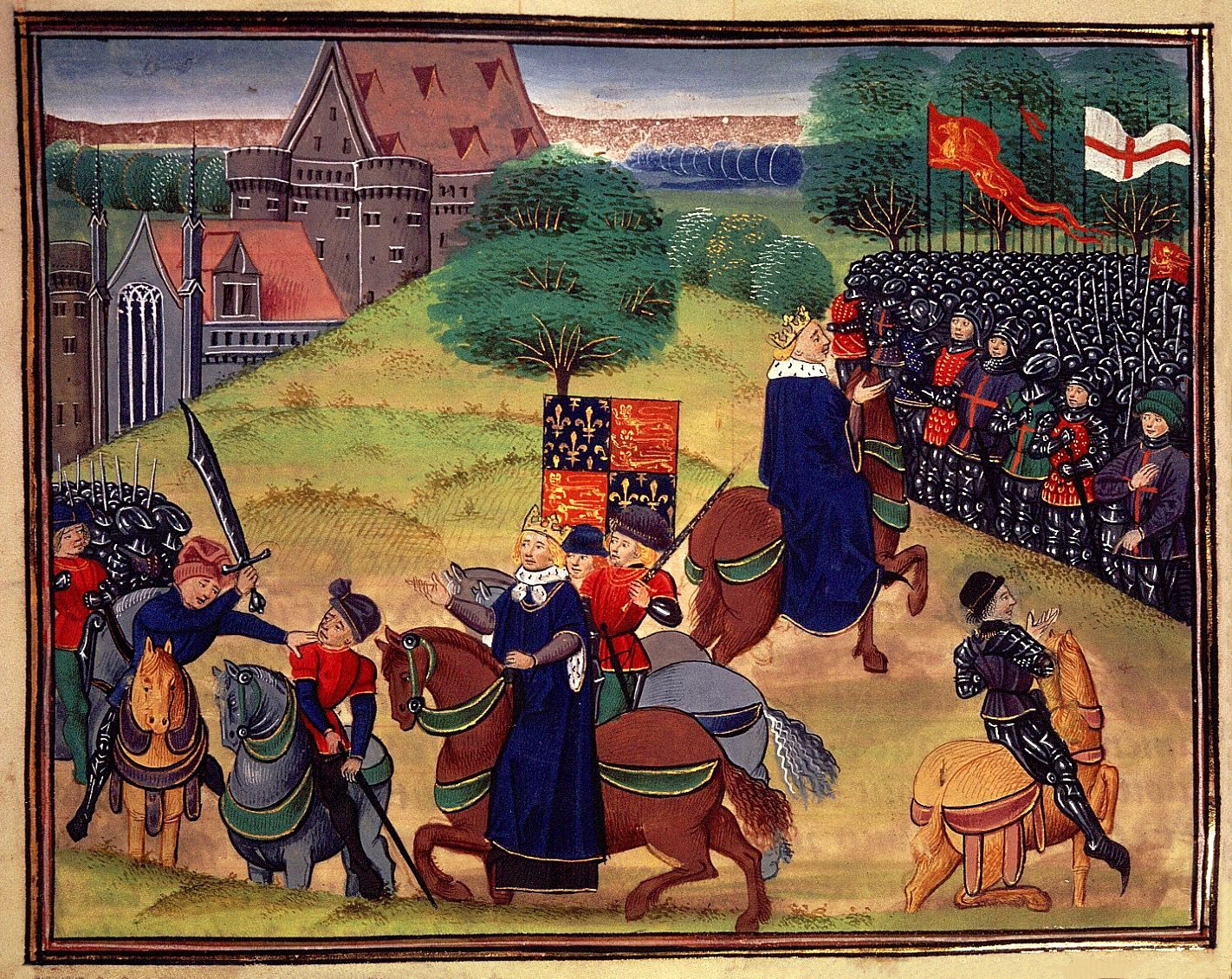
The Peasants' Revolt of 1381: the rebel leader Wat Tyler is killed on the left, while the young Richard II pacifies the crowd on the right

These legislative measures proved largely inefficient at regulating the market, but the government's repressive measures to enforce them caused public resentment. These conditions were contributing factors to the Peasants' Revolt in 1381. The revolt started in Kent and Essex in late May, and once the rebels reached London they burnt down John of Gaunt's Savoy Palace, and killed both the Chancellor and the Treasurer. They then demanded the complete abolition of serfdom, and were not pacified until the young King Richard II personally intervened. The rebellion was eventually suppressed, but the social changes it promoted were already irreversible. By around 1400 serfdom was virtually extinct in England, replaced by the form of tenure called copyhold.

It is conspicuous how well the English government handled the crisis of the mid-14th century, without descending into chaos and total collapse in the manner of the Valois government of France. To a large extent this was the accomplishment of administrators such as Treasurer William de Shareshull and Chief Justice William Edington, whose highly competent leadership guided the governance of the nation through the crisis. The plague's greatest effect on the government was probably in the field of war, where no major campaigns were launched in France until 1355.

Another notable consequence of the Black Death was the raising of the real wage of England (due to the shortage of labour as a result of the reduction in population), a trait shared across Western Europe, which in general led to a real wage in 1450 that was unmatched in most countries until the 19th or 20th century. The higher wages for workers combined with sinking prices on grain products led to a problematic economic situation for the gentry. As a result, they started to show an increased interest for offices like justice of the peace, sheriff and member of parliament. The gentry took advantage of their new positions and a more systematic corruption than before spread. A result of this was that the gentry as a group became highly disliked by commoners.

=== Religious and cultural consequences ===
The omnipresence of death also inspired greater piety in the upper classes, which can be seen in the fact that three Cambridge colleges were founded during or shortly after the Black Death. England did not experience the same trend of roving bands of flagellants, common on the continent. Neither were there any pogroms against the Jews, since the Jews had been expelled by Edward I in 1290.

The high rate of mortality among the clergy naturally led to a shortage of priests in many parts of the country. The clergy were seen to have an elevated status among ordinary people and this was partly due to their purported closeness with God, being his envoys on earth. However, as the church itself had given the cause of the Black Death to be the impropriety of the behaviour of men, the higher death rate among the clergy led the people to lose faith in the Church as an institution—it had proved as ineffectual against the horror of Y. pestis as every other medieval institution. The corruption within the Catholic priesthood also angered the English people. Many priests abandoned the terrified people. Others sought benefits from the rich families who needed burials. The dissatisfaction led to anti-clericalism and the rise of John Wycliffe, an English priest. His ideas paved a path for the Christian reformation in England. Some people did not lose their Christian faith, if anything it was renewed; they began to long for a more personal relationship with God—around the time after the Black Death many chantries (private chapels) began to spread in use from not just the nobility, but to among the well-to-do. This change in the power of the papacy in England is demonstrated by the statutes of Praemunire.

The Black Death also affected arts and culture significantly. It was inevitable that a catastrophe of such proportions would affect some of the greater building projects, as the amount of available labour fell sharply. The building of the cathedrals of Ely and Exeter was temporarily halted in the years immediately following the first outbreak of the plague. The shortage of labour also helped advance the transition from the Decorated style of building to the less elaborate Perpendicular style. The Black Death may also have promoted the use of vernacular English, as the number of teachers proficient in French dwindled, contributing to the late-14th-century flowering of English literature, represented by writers such as Geoffrey Chaucer and John Gower.

== Recurrences ==
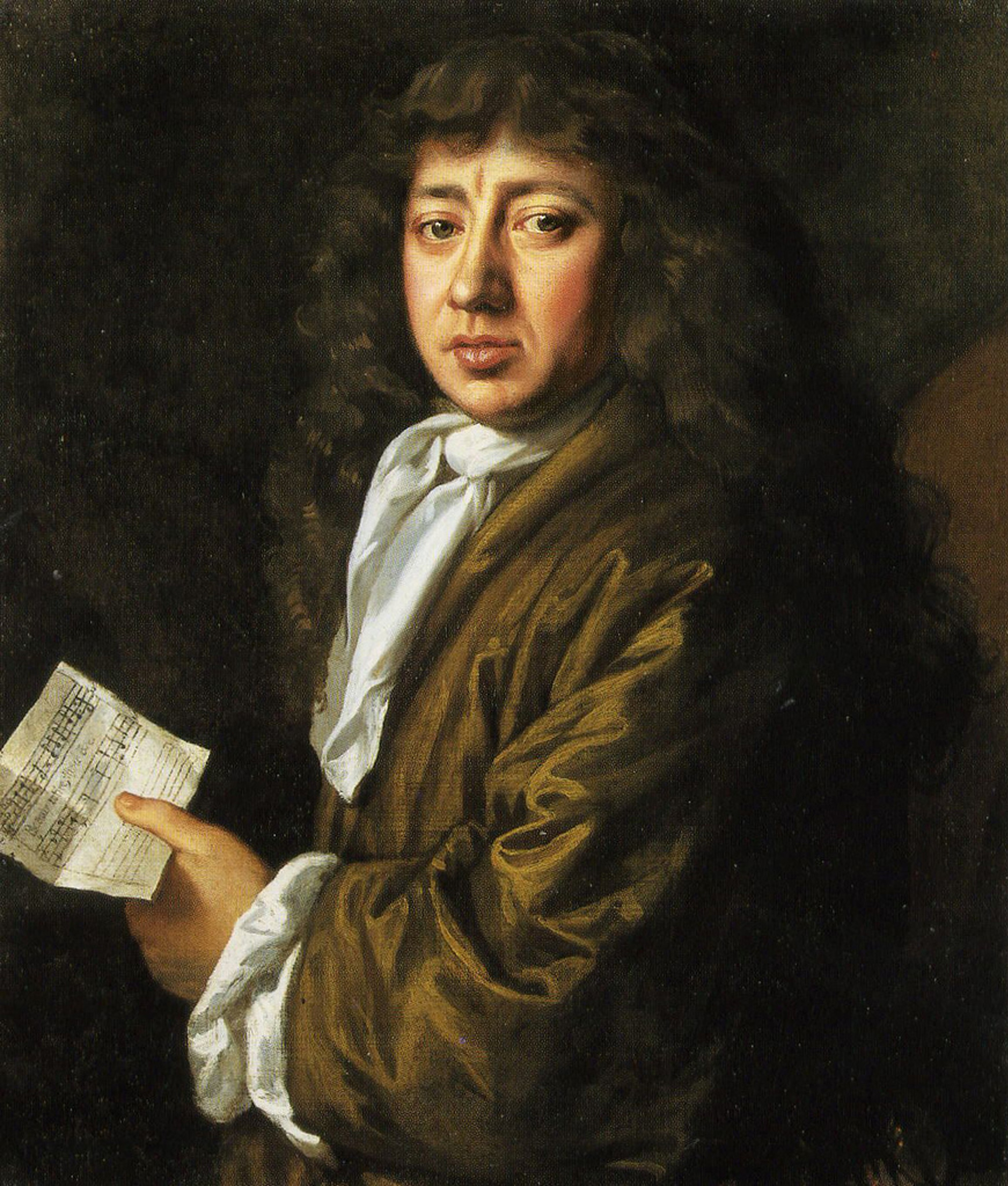
In his diaries, Samuel Pepys gave a vivid description of the Great Plague of London; one of the last outbreaks of the second pandemic.

The Black Death was the first occurrence of the second pandemic, which continued to strike England and the rest of Europe more or less regularly until the 18th century. The first serious recurrence in England came in the years 1361−62. Little is known about the death rates caused by these later outbreaks, but the so-called pestis secunda may have had a mortality of around 20 per cent. Genetic analysis performed on remains recovered from the abbey of St. Mary's Graces dating between 1353 and 1364 found the pPCP1 plasmid, a plasmid only found in Yersinia pestis and not the related environmental agent Yersinia pseudotuberculosis, revealing that this outbreak was also caused by Yersinia pestis just as the initial outbreak had been. This epidemic was also particularly devastating for the population's ability to recover, since it disproportionately affected infants and young men. This was also the case with the next occurrence, in 1369, where the death rate was around 10−15 per cent.

Over the following decades the plague would return—on a national or a regional level—at intervals of five to 12 years, with gradually dwindling death tolls. Then, in the decades from 1430 to 1480, the disease returned in force. An outbreak in 1471 took as much as 10–15 per cent of the population, while the death rate of the plague of 1479–1480 could have been as high as 20 per cent. From that point outbreaks became fewer and more manageable, due largely to conscious efforts by central and local governments—from the late 15th century onward—to curtail the disease. This included quarantines on people and goods coming from infected places, bans on public gatherings (such as fairs), enforced household quarantine for the infected (known as 'locking up') and quarantines on ships and crews coming from ports where Plague outbreaks had occurred. From the early 17th century there was also greater use of quarantine facilities, called pesthouses, in preference to household quarantine. Some of these, such as the Forlorn Hope Pesthouse established by Bristol in 1665–6, appear to have been proper quarantine hospitals, staffed by doctors. The establishment of such a hospital may help to explain why the death rate in Bristol in the 1665–66 outbreak was "only" c.0.6 percent. This was much lower than the mortality rate of 10–20 percent witnessed in Bristol's Plague epidemics of 1565, 1575, 1603–1604 and 1645. The Great Plague of 1665–66 was the last major outbreak in England. It is best known for the famous Great Plague of London, which killed 100,000 people (20 per cent of the population) in the capital. Other places hit hard included Eyam in Derbyshire, Derby itself and Norwich.

== See also ==
- Globalization and disease
- Abandoned village
- Population decline
- Medieval demography
- Crisis of the Late Middle Ages
- Popular revolts in late-medieval Europe
- List of epidemics

== Sources ==
- Benedictow, Ole J. (2004). The Black Death 1346–1353: The Complete History. Woodbridge: Boydell Press. ISBN 0-85115-943-5.
- Bolton, Jim (1996). "'The world upside down': plague as an agent of economic and social change". In Mark Ormrod & P.G. Lindley (ed.). The Black Death in England. Stamford: Paul Watkins. pp. 17–78. ISBN 1-871615-56-9.
- Deaux, George (1969). The Black Death, 1347. London: Hamilton. ISBN 978-0679400110.
- Goldberg, Jeremy (1996). "Introduction". In Mark Ormrod & P.G. Lindley (ed.). The Black Death in England. Stamford: Paul Watkins. pp. 1–15. ISBN 1-871615-56-9.
- Gottfried, Robert S. (1983). The Black Death: Natural and Human Disaster in Medieval Europe. London: Hale. ISBN 0-7090-1299-3.
- Harper-Bill, Christopher (1996). "The English church and English religion after the Black Death". In Mark Ormrod & P.G. Lindley (ed.). The Black Death in England. Stamford: Paul Watkins. pp. 79–123. ISBN 1-871615-56-9.
- Hatcher, John (1977). Plague, Population and the English Economy, 1348–1530. London: Macmillan. ISBN 0-333-21293-2.
- Hatcher, John (1994). "England in the aftermath of the Black Death". Past & Present (144): 3–35. doi:10.1093/past/144.1.3.
- Hatcher, John (2008). The Black Death: An Intimate History. London: Weidenfeld and Nicolson. ISBN 978-0-297-84475-4.
- Herlihy, David (1997). The Black Death and the transformation of the West. Cambridge, Mass.; London: Harvard University Press. ISBN 0-7509-3202-3.
- Hilton, Rodney; Dyer, Christopher (2003). Bond Men Made Free: Medieval Peasant Movements and the English Rising of 1381 (2nd ed.). London: Routledge. ISBN 0-415-31614-6.
- Horrox, Rosemary (1994). The Black Death. Manchester: Manchester University Press. ISBN 0-7190-3497-3.
- Lewis, Carenza (June 2016). "Disaster recovery: new archaeological evidence for the long-term impact of the "calamitous" fourteenth century". Antiquity. 90 (351): 777–797. doi:10.15184/aqy.2016.69. S2CID 164178697.
- Lindley, Phillip (1996). "The Black Death and English art: a debate and some assumptions". In Mark Ormrod & P.G. Lindley (ed.). The Black Death in England. Stamford: Paul Watkins. pp. 124–46. ISBN 1-871615-56-9.
- Ormrod, Mark (1986). "The English government and the Black Death of 1348–49". In Mark Ormrod (ed.). England in the Fourteenth Century. Woodbridge: Boydell. pp. 175–88. ISBN 0-85115-448-4.
- Ormrod, Mark; Lindley, P.G., eds. (1996). The Black Death in England. Stamford: Paul Watkins. ISBN 1-871615-56-9.
- Ormrod, Mark (1996). "The politics of pestilence: government in England after the Black Death". In Mark Ormrod & P.G. Lindley (ed.). The Black Death in England. Stamford: Paul Watkins. pp. 147–81. ISBN 1-871615-56-9.
- Ormrod, Mark (2000). "England: Edward II and Edward III". In Jones, Michael (ed.). The New Cambridge Medieval History, Volume 6, c.1300–c.1415. Cambridge: Cambridge University Press. ISBN 978-1-13905574-1.
- Prestwich, M.C. (2005). Plantagenet England: 1225–1360. Oxford: Oxford University Press. ISBN 0-19-822844-9.
- Rasmussen, S (2015). "Early divergent strains of Yersinia pestis in Eurasia 5,000 years ago". Cell. 163 (3): 571–82. doi:10.1016/j.cell.2015.10.009. PMC 4644222. PMID 26496604.
- Russell, Josias Cox (1948). British Medieval Population. Albuquerque: University of New Mexico Press.
- Ziegler, Philip (2003). The Black Death (News ed.). Sutton: Sutton Publishing Ltd. ISBN 0-7509-3202-3.
