= The Paris Concilium =

14th century document

The Paris Concilium was a 1348 document written at the request of King Philip VI of France by 49 medical members of the University of Paris. The authors of the document state that the cause of the plague was not something that could be grasped by humans and would never be known. They focused on an analysis of why humans had been stricken with the plague based on celestial and earthly portents.

The authors guessed at possible causes including a conjunction of Saturn, Jupiter and Mars under the water sign of Aquarius, an event they claimed had taken place on 20 March 1345 after a solar and lunar eclipse. Basing their theory on Aristotle's Meteorology (Aristotle) (350 BC) and Hippocrates Epidemics (310 BC), they said that a conjunction of Saturn and Jupiter brings disaster. From Albert the Great, they borrowed the theory that a conjunction of Jupiter and Mars brings plague, because Jupiter was hot and moist and these qualities were believed to lead to rot and putrefaction which they associated with plague. Other theories involved comets or other similar signs.

The terrestrial cause, that was seen as a proximate cause, was that the air had been poisoned by gas that was released during earthquakes. "Evil constellations" brought rain, thunder and moist south winds that spread the poisonous vapors given off my rotting carcasses. In the Middle Ages the heart was believed to be the organ governing the respiratory function, so they believed that this poisoned air reached the heart through breath and contaminated the spirit, causing organs to rot. This was based on The Canon of Medicine (القانون في الطب al-Qānūn fī al-Ṭibb) by Avicenna.

== See also ==
- Black Death in France

== Sources ==
- Kleinhenz, Christopher. Medieval Italy: An Encyclopedia. United Kingdom, Taylor & Francis, 2004.
- Knodgrass, Mary Ellen. World Epidemics: A Cultural Chronology of Disease from Prehistory to the Era of Zika, 2d Ed.. United States: McFarland, Incorporated, Publishers, 2017
