= Black Death in France =

14th-century plague pandemic

1346–1353 spread of the Black Death in Europe map

The Black Death was present in France between 1347 and 1352. The bubonic plague pandemic, known as the Black Death, reached France by ship from Italy to Marseille in November 1347. From Marseille, the Black Death spread first through Southern France, and then continued outwards to Northern France.

Due to the large size and population of the Kingdom of France, the pandemic lasted for several years, as some parts weren't affected until the plague was over in others. The Kingdom of France had the largest population of Europe at the time, and the Black Death was a major catastrophe. The plague killed roughly 50,000 people in Paris, which made up about half of the city's population. The Black Death in France was described by eyewitnesses, such as Louis Heyligen, Jean de Venette, and Gilles Li Muisis. The Black Death migrated from Southern France to Spain, from Eastern France to the Holy Roman Empire, and to England by ship from Gascony.

At the time, Pope Clement VI resided in present-day Avignon during the Western Schism, and issued his condemnations of the Jewish persecutions during the Black Death, as well as the flagellants. During the Black Death in France, King Philip VI of France ordered the University of Paris to compose the pioneering work, Compendium de Epidemia, due to the pandemic.

== Background ==
=== France in the mid-14th century ===
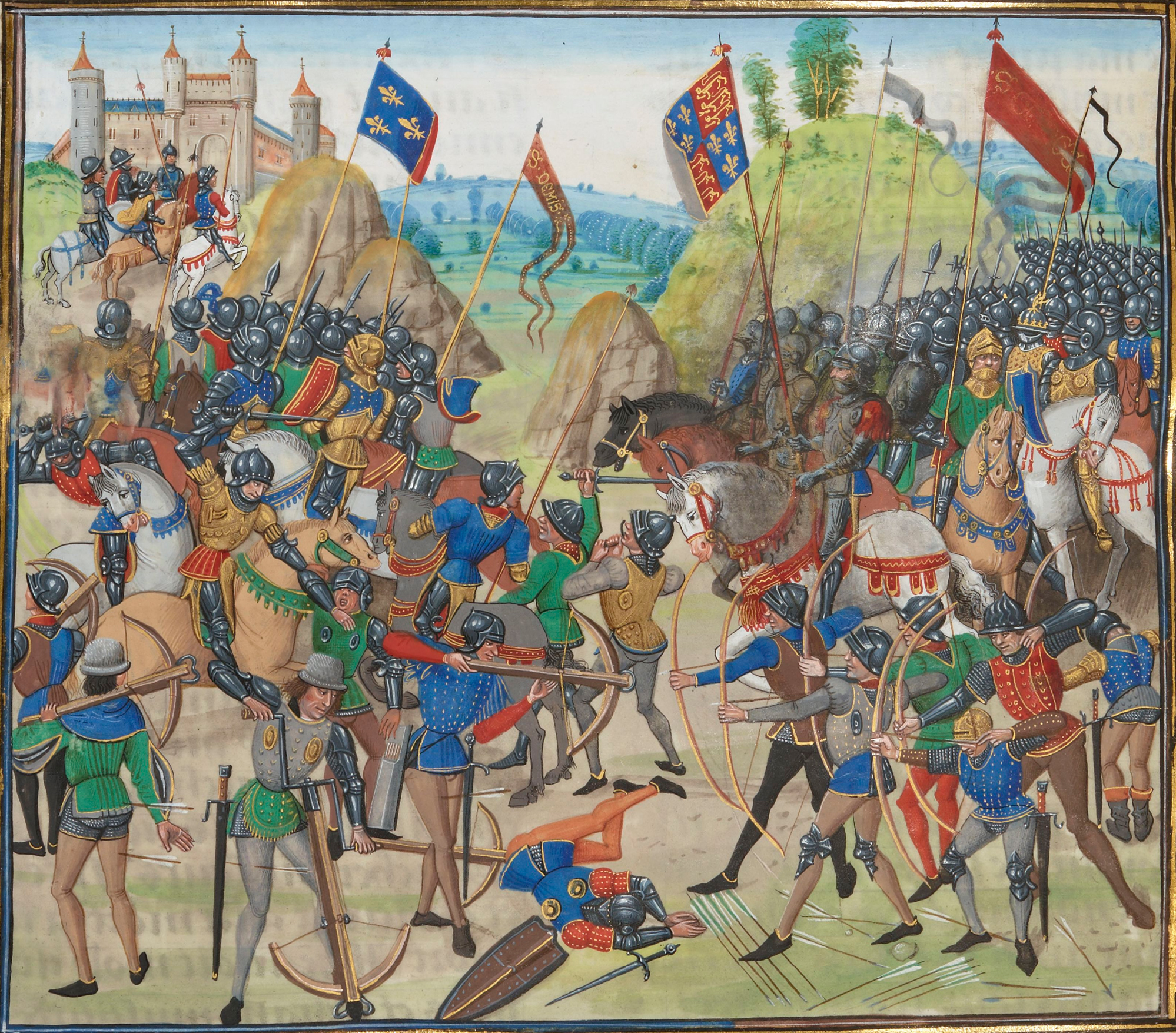
The Battle of Crécy

At this point in time, France and England had entered the Hundred Years' War. In 1346, France had lost the Battle of Crécy. Pope Clement VI lived in present-day Avignon during the Western Schism. The war had placed considerable financial strain on France, and in November 1347 Philip VI called a general assembly of the Estates General to agree emergency measures to fund the conflict – a war subsidy; different regions of the kingdom decided how to pay the subsidy, such as opting for sales taxes or hearth taxes.

On the eve of the Black Death, the country had between 16 and 17 million inhabitants, around 20 million within its current borders, the largest population in Europe. Similarly to Italy, it was relatively urbanized.

=== The Black Death ===
Since the outbreak of the Black Death in Crimea, it had reached Sicily by an Italian ship from the Crimea. After having spread across the Italian states, the plague reached France by a plague ship in November of 1347. Because the Black Death arrived in Marseille first, it spread across the French Mediterranean coast and up the Rhone river. Marseille was a major center for trade so it also affected the spread of the Black Death to a lot of Western Europe because it was a major trade center in the Mediterranean as well as southern France. The plague’s mortality was high in the winter but substantially higher in the warmer months. The mortality rate for the plague was 70–80% and in the first four years of the plague in Europe, roughly 20 million people died.

The main form of the Black Death was bubonic plague, however, there were other forms such as septicemic plague which infected the bloodstream, and pneumonic plague which infected the lungs.

== Plague migration ==
=== Southern France ===
The plague in Southern France was described by Louis Heyligen in Avignon. According to Heyligen, the Black Death reached France in December 1347, when a Genovese plague ship from the East was forced to leave its home port of Genova shortly after its return, and arrived in Marseilles instead. The ship spread the plague in Marseilles, was subsequently forced to leave the city, and continued on its way along the coast of Southern France. The plague ship spread the pestilence all along its course, which included areas from West Marseille towards Toulouse, and north toward Avignon. In May 1348, a 2nd wave came by land from Genova.

In Avignon, the Pope arranged religious processions to dampen the wrath of God, as the plague was interpreted by the church as a punishment by God for the sins of humanity. The Pope was advised by his physician, Gui de Chauliac, to hide from the plague in Étoile-sur-Rhône, where he survived the outbreak.

The Black Death in Southwest France was not as well-documented as it was in Avignon. It was noted to have been in Carcassonne in January 1348, and in Toulouse by April that same year. It was confirmed in Bordeaux in June 1348, but it was likely to have been present there already by as early as March. Documentation stated that it was a ship of pilgrims from Bordeaux who brought the plague to Santiago de Compostela in Spain.

In April 1348, the Black Death was recorded to have reached Lyon.

=== Northern France ===
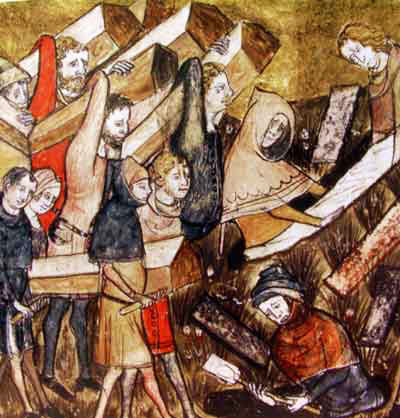
The citizens of Tournai, Belgium burying deceased victims of the plague during the Black Death. Detail shot of a miniature from a folio of the Antiquitates Flandriae. By Pierart dou Tielt (c. 1340–1360 CE). Made c. 1353.

From Lyon, the plague spread rapidly across Burgundy. In the village of Givry in Burgundy, 50% of the population was confirmed to have died within the short period of August–November 1348.

The Black Death in Paris has been described in the famous chronicle of the Carmelite Jean de Venette, who resided at the Saint-Denis Abbey in Île-de-France, located outside of Paris. At the time, Paris was the biggest city in Europe, with a population between 80,000–200,000 people. According to Jean de Venette, the plague first arrived to Roissy near Gonesse in June 1348. In his writings, de Venette claimed that 16,000 people died in Saint-Denis, and an additional 800 people perished each day in Paris between November–December 1348. Overwhelming amounts of death resulted in daily transports of up to 500 dead bodies to mass burial sites. The deceased were transported from the Hôtel-Dieu, Paris hospital, which was staffed by nuns, whose numbers dwindled as they perished alongside the sick to which they attended.

The presence of the plague was documented in the Normanniae nova Cronica to have reached Rouen in Normandie during the feast of John the Baptist on 24 June 1348. In Normandie, the plague made it impossible to bury the corpses even in country villages, and each village which was reached by the plague flagged a black flag to warn anyone approaching.

In the very Northern parts of France, the Black Death is described in the chronicle of the abbot Gilles li Muisis of Tournai. According to Li Muisis, the plague reached Tournai in August 1349 and lasted until November. In Tournai, the Black Death caused a religious reformation. Because the plague was seen as punishment of God for the sins of humanity, the authorities issued regulations to ban everything regarded as sinful, such as gambling, as well as forcing couples who lived together without being married to separate or marry immediately.

Due to the size of France, certain parts weren't immediately reached by the plague, which travelled more slowly by land than by sea. Brittany and Auvergne weren't reached until 1349, and some remote parts weren't reached until 1351. The last part of France to be reached by the Black Death was Tonnerre, which wasn't reached until 1352.

== Consequences ==
When the plague spread across Southern France, king Philip VI of France ordered the University of Paris to compose the pioneering work Compendium de epidemia due to the pandemic. The Paris Concilium was written about the plague.

The Black Death made it much more difficult for the kingdom to pay the war subsidy that had been agreed in late 1347. By the second half of 1349, France's spending on war had decreased as the Black Death had spread to England by this point and led to a pause in fighting.

The migration of the plague caused panic across France, and people started looking for scapegoats. Rumours started to spread that the plague was caused by people who poisoned the wells to cause the plague and exterminate Christendom. Initially, these accusations weren't directed at people of any particular category, but directed at anyone who appeared suspicious simply because they were different or unidentified, particularly travellers (such as pilgrims and beggars) invalids, or people in possession of any kind of powder. In April 1348, Louis Heyligen reported that people were executed for well-poisoning in Avignon; the same month, Andre Benezeit, secretary of mayor Aymar of Narbonne, reported to the mayor of Gerona in Catalonia that many beggars had been arrested, tortured and executed in Narbonne, Carcassonne and Grasse for well-poisoning.

These accusations were eventually directed against the Jewish population, and on 5 July (and again on 26 September) Pope Clement VI issued his condemnations of the Jewish persecutions during the Black Death and explained that since the plague was a punishment issued by God himself, it was sinful to accuse the Jews of having caused it, and declared the Jews to be under his protection. While there is not much information about the Jewish persecutions during the Black Death in France, the Jewish population was small due to the fact that Louis IX of France had banned them from France, the well-poisoning rumours from France erupted into documented persecutions and mass executions in the Duchy of Savoy, and resulted in massacres in the Holy Roman Empire, where the Jewish population was larger. Several anti-Jewish riots took place while the Black Death was at its peak in April and May 1348, including the massacre of at least 40 Jews in Toulon and the Jewish community at La Baume de Sisteron, both in Provence. Further communities were wiped out at Narbonne and Carcassonne, also in southern France.

== Recurrences ==
Bubonic plague would return regularly, but with fewer fatalities, until the 18th century. The last epidemic in France was the Great Plague of Marseille in 1720. The Spanish erected a cordon while the French army surrounded Provence using a third of its infantry and a quarter of its cavalry.

== See also ==
- Strasbourg massacre – 1349 massacre of two thousand Jews in Strasbourg (at the time a self-ruling city and not ruled by the Kingdom of France)

== Sources ==
- Byrne, Joseph P. (2012). Encyclopedia of the Black Death. Bloomsbury Publishing USA. ISBN 979-8-216-15485-3.
- Henneman, John B. (1968). "The Black Death and Royal Taxation in France, 1347-1351". Speculum. 43 (3): 405–428. doi:10.2307/2855836. ISSN 0038-7134. JSTOR 2855836.
- Shatzmïller, Joseph (1974). "Les Juifs de Provence pendant la Peste noire". Revue des études juives (in French). 133 (3): 462–463. doi:10.3406/rjuiv.1974.1785. ISSN 0484-8616.
- Ziegler, Philip (1970) [1969]. The Black Death. Harmondsworth: Penguin Books.
