= Philip Daileader =

American historian (born 1968)

Philip H. Daileader, Jr.
- Born: October 25, 1968 (age 57); Queens, New York
- Education: Johns Hopkins University (BA); Harvard University (MA, PhD)
- Occupations: Historian, author
- Writing career
- Subject: Medieval history

Philip Daileader is a professor of history at the College of William & Mary in Virginia.

== Early life and education ==
Daileader was born in Queens, New York, on October 25, 1968, and grew up in Central Islip, New York. He attended St. Anthony's High School in Smithtown and then South Huntington, New York. He received his B.A. (1990) in history from Johns Hopkins University and earned his M.A. (1991) and Ph.D. (1996) in history from Harvard University.

== Teaching ==
Prior to taking his position at William & Mary, Daileader taught at the University of Alabama and the State University of New York at New Paltz. From 2008 to 2011, he served as the chairman of the Department of History at William & Mary. He is seen in various "History Channel" videos, mostly dealing with the Middle Ages. Daileader has also created numerous courses for The Teaching Company on topics including the Middle Ages, Crusades, and Charlemagne.

As a graduate student, Daileader was a four-time winner of the "Harvard University Certificate of Distinction in Teaching." At William & Mary, he has held a University Professorship for Teaching Excellence and been awarded an Alumni Fellowship Award for Teaching and a Phi Beta Kappa Award for Excellence in Teaching (Alpha chapter of Virginia). In 2012, The Princeton Review named him one of the 300 best professors in America. Daileader also received the Thomas Ashley Graves Jr. Award for Sustained Teaching Excellence in 2016.

== Books ==
Daileader's book Saint Vincent Ferrier, His World and Life: Religion and Society in Late Medieval Europe won the La corónica International Book Award “for the best monograph published on Medieval Hispanic Languages, Literatures, and Cultures” in 2018.

== Bibliography ==
Articles (select)

- "Corporations et gouvernance à Perpignan en 1449." In Histoire et archéologie en Pays catalan. Mélanges offerts à Aymat Catafau, Trabucaire, 2024, pp. 285–300.
- "Local Experiences of the Great Western Schism," in J. Rollo-Koster and T. Izbicki (eds.), A Companion to the Great Western Schism (1378-1417), Brill, 2009, pp. 89–121.
- "Catalonia and the Midi: Sixty Years of Urban History," Imago temporis: medium aevum 1 (2007) 31–58.
- "La coutume dans un pays aux trois religions: la Catalogne, 1228-1319," Annales du Midi 118 (2006): 369–385.
- "The Vanishing Consulates of Catalonia," Speculum, Vol. 74, No. 1. (Jan., 1999), pp. 65–94.
- "Town and Countryside in Northeastern Catalonia, 1267-ca. 1450: The sobreposats de la horta of Perpignan," Journal of Medieval History 24 (1998): 347–66
- "One Will, One Voice, and Equal Love: Papal Elections and the Liber Pontificalis in the Early Middle Ages," Archivum historiae pontificiae 31 (1993): 11–31.

Books

- Time and Governance in Fifteenth-Century Perpignan, Cambridge University Press, 2025.
- Saint Vincent Ferrer, His World and Life: Religion and Society in Late Medieval Europe, Palgrave MacMillan, 2016. Spanish translation: San Vicente Ferrer - Su mundo y su vida and Catalan translation: La vida i el món de Sant Vicent Ferrer, Universitat de València, 2019.
- Co-edited with Philip Whalen. French Historians, 1900-2000. New Historical Writing in Twentieth-Century France, Wiley-Blackwell, 2010.
- True Citizens - Violence, Memory, and Identity in the Medieval Community of Perpignan 1162-1397, Brill Academic Publishers, Leiden, Boston, Köln, 2000. French translation: De Vrais Citoyens - Violence, mémoire et identité dans la communauté médiévale de Perpignan 1162-1397, Trabucaire, 2004.

Video lectures

- How the Crusades Changed History, Course No. 30650, The Teaching Company, 2023.
- Charlemagne: Father of Europe, Course No. 30250, The Teaching Company, 2022.
- The Late Middle Ages, Course No. 8296, The Teaching Company, 2007. ISBN 978-1-59803-345-8
- The Early Middle Ages, Course No. 8267, The Teaching Company, 2004. ISBN 1-56585-916-2
- The High Middle Ages, Course No. 869, The Teaching Company, 2001. ISBN 1-56585-827-1

Audio lectures

- How the Crusades Changed History, Course No. 3931, The Teaching Company, 2013.
