= Ole Jørgen Benedictow =

Norwegian historian (born 1941)

- Born: 22 July 1941 (age 85); Oslo, Reichskommissariat Norwegen (today Norway)
- Education: University of Oslo
- Scientific career
- Fields: Medieval history Black Death
- Workplaces: University of Oslo

Ole Jørgen Benedictow (born 22 July 1941) is a Norwegian historian. Having spent his entire professional career at the University of Oslo, he is especially known for his work on plagues, especially the Black Death.

== Career ==
He was born in Oslo. He graduated from the University of Oslo with a cand. philol. degree in history in 1968, and was immediately hired as a research fellow. From early on he concentrated on the Late Middle Ages. In 1977, he published Fra rike til provins 1448-1536, volume five of the work Cappelens Norgeshistorie, on Norwegian history. He was promoted to associate professor, and from 1990 to 1992 he worked as manager of the Department of Archeology, Conservation and Historical Studies. In 1992, he took the dr.philos. degree with the thesis Plague in the late Medieval Nordic Countries. He followed in 1993 with The Medieval Demographic System of the Nordic Countries, and was promoted to professor in medieval history in the same year. He is currently a professor emeritus. In 2002, he published Svartedauen og senere pestepidemier i Norge: pestepidemiens historie i Norge 1348-1654, on the history of plague in Norway.

His main works having revolved mainly around Norway and the Nordic countries, Benedictow's book The Black Death 1346-1353: The Complete History, from 2004, is an extensive study of the impact of the Black Death, drawing on material from all over Europe. Here he makes the claim that the Black Death caused the death of as much as 60% of the population of Europe. Such a high death rate was previously unheard of in the historiography of the field. The assertion has not been universally accepted in the historical community. He has also argued that the disease that engulfed Iceland during the years 1402–1404 was not, in fact, the same the bacterium Yersinia pestis that caused the Black Death.

In addition to his academic work, Benedictow is known for prolific writing in print media, as well as giving lectures outside of the university.
