= Plague pandemic =

Plague pandemic may refer to:

- First plague pandemic
- Second plague pandemic
- Third plague pandemic
