= Peter Clark (historian) =

British historian

Peter Alan Clark (born 24 May 1944) is a British historian. Since 2000, he was professor of European urban history at the University of Helsinki. He retired in 2011.

Clark was educated at Balliol College, Oxford and graduated (Modern History first class) in 1966. He started his career as a research fellow at Magdalen College, Oxford. He was then lecturer, reader and later professor of economic and social history at the University of Leicester. From 1985 to 1999, he was the first director of the Centre for Urban History of the University of Leicester.

In 1989, he was co-founder (with Bernard Lepetit and Herman Diederiks) of the European Association for Urban History and served as its treasurer from 1989 to 2010. He was also Secretary of International Commission for the History of Towns 1993 to 1995.

He has contributed to a number of publications, including the Cambridge Urban History of Britain. Clark is a member of the Finnish Academy of Science and Letters and a fellow of the Royal Historical Society, of which he was a Council member from 1991 to 1995. He was elected a member of the Academia Europaea in 2011 and the Royal Belgian Academy (Flemish) in 2015. He was awarded an Honorary Degree of Philosophy by Stockholm University in 2012.

== Bibliography ==
- Editor (with Paul Slack), Crisis and Order in English Towns (Routledge, 1972, 2006)
- (with P. Slack), English Towns in Transition 1500-1700 (Oxford, 1976, Japanese edition, 1988)
- Editor, The Early Modern Town (Longman, 1976).
- The English Alehouse: A Social History (Longman, 1983); awarded the Royal Historical Society Whitfield Prize.
- Editor, Small Towns in Early Modern Europe (Cambridge University Press, 1995), paperback edition 2002.
- British Clubs and Societies (Oxford University Press, 2000); paperback edition 2002.
- Editor, Cambridge Urban History of Britain vol. 2 1540-1840 (Cambridge UP, 2000).
- General Editor, Cambridge Urban History of Britain 3 vols. 85 contributors (Cambridge UP, 2000).
- Joint editor (with R. Gillespie), London & Dublin in Early Modern period (British Academy/Oxford, 2001)
- Editor, The European City and Green Space: London, Stockholm, Helsinki and St Petersburg 1850-2000 (Ashgate, 2006)
- European Cities and Towns 400-2000 (Oxford University Press, 2009). Chinese edition 2015.
- Editor, The Oxford Handbook of Cities in World History (Oxford University Press, 2013), 40 contributors, 950 pages. E-book edition.
- Joint-editor (with Marjaana Niemi and Catharina Nolin), Green Landscapes in the European City (Routledge, 2016)
