= Vilfan =

Vilfan is a surname. Notable people with the surname include:

- Josip Vilfan (1878–1955), Slovenian lawyer, politician and activist
- Peter Vilfan (born 1957), Slovenian basketball player, journalist, commentator, and politician
- Sergij Vilfan (1919–1996), Slovenian lawyer and historian
