= Bernadette Suau =

French archivist and historian (1942–2013)

- Born: Bernadette Noulens; 3 September 1942; Mirande, Gers, France
- Died: December 8, 2013 (aged 71); Toulouse, France
- Occupations: Archivist and historian
- Years active: 1978–2003

Bernadette Suau (3 September 1942 – 8 December 2013) was a French archivist and historian. She was deputy director of the Eure departmental archives from 1972 to 1978, director of the Landes departmental archives from 1978 to 1992, and director of the Haute-Garonne departmental archives from 1992 to 2003.

Suau is the author or publication director of numerous works relating to history and heritage, of several exhibition catalogues that she has organised in Landes and Haute-Garonne, and of archive registers. She is one of the authors of the Histoire de la Gascogne contemporaine (1983), and the main author and publication director of the biographical dictionary Mémoire des Landes (1991). She was a member of several associations and learned societies, including the Archaeological Society of the South of France and the Historical Federation of Midi-Pyrénées, of which she was the general secretary.

== Early life ==
Bernadette Noulens was born on 3 September 1942 in Mirande, Gers in south western France. Her father was the nephew of poet and journalist Joseph Noulens (1828–1898) from Landes and was a lawyer. She spoke the Gascon dialect of the Occitan language. She obtained her bachelor's degree and degree in history at the Faculty of Letters at the University of Toulouse. She obtained the diploma of archivist-paleographer on 6 May 1971 from École Nationale des Chartes after having defended a thesis titled Rodez in the middle of the XV [15th] century. century.

== Career ==
Bernadette Noulens began her career as an archivist the same year, at the French National Archives, but only stayed there for a year, intending to pursue a career in the departmental archives services. She was appointed deputy director of the Eure departmental archives on 1 March 1972 and held the position till 1978, and held the position of departmental curator of antiquities and works of art. On 1 December 1978, she became the director of the Landes departmental archives. Upon taking office, she remodeled the department and its library, reorganized the directories, created a photographic service and began reproducing parish and civil status registers from the Landes municipalities, subsequently enabling their digitization and online publication. The department also organised several exhibitions with the first one beginning in 1984, titled "Medieval Mont-de-Marsan".

In June 1980 she was one of the founding members of the association of Friends of the old churches of Landes. She was its secretary and then its honorary president, and published several studies on religious buildings in the department. often in collaboration with art historians Jean Cabanot and Jean-Pierre Suau. As director of the departmental archives, she supported the creation of the Friends of the Landes Archives association and Landes Research and Safeguarding association. She is one of the authors of the reference work Histoire de la Gascogne contemporaine, edited by Maurice Bordes and published in 1983.

In 1985 Philippe Wolff, a medieval historian, and member of the Academie des inscriptions et belles-lettres and former professor of Bernadette Suau at the University of Toulouse, offered his support to publish a departmental biographical dictionary. Suau accepted and put together a team of local historians, which resulted in the publication in 1991 of Mémoire des Landes, the only biographical reference dictionary concerning the Landes department. After fourteen years in the Landes, she was appointed as the director of the Haute-Garonne departmental archives on 1 October 1992. She also took on the role of departmental curator of antiquities and works of art. She was appointed general curator of heritage on 15 January 1995. She remained head of the departmental archives of Haute-Garonne until her retirement in 2003.

== Post retirement and death ==
Her last publication was The Brotherhoods of Penitents in Toulouse (2011), in collaboration with Nicole Andrieu. Suffering from a serious illness, she died in Toulouse on 8 September 2013 at the age of 71. She is buried in the cemetery of Hinx, in the Landes.

== Awards and honors ==
For her involvement in the protection and preservation of heritage, the Foundation for the Preservation of French Art awarded her the Marquise de Maillé Prize in 1971. For her career in the archives and her activity within cultural and scientific associations, she received several other decorations.

- Chevalière de l'ordre des Arts et des Lettres (7 January 1981)
- Chevalière de l'ordre des Palmes académiques (20 February 1988)
- Chevalière de l'ordre national du Mérite (14 May 2004)
