= Great Plague of Seville =

Disease outbreak in Seville, Spain

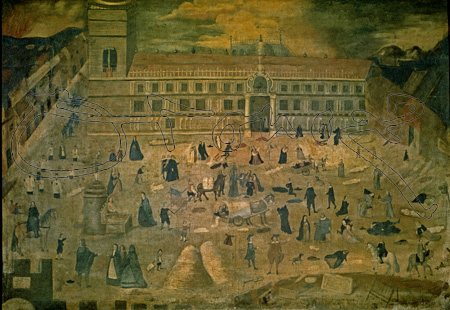
Contemporary painting of a hospital during the Great Plague in Seville

The Great Plague of Seville (1647–1652) was a massive outbreak of disease in Spain that killed up to a quarter of Seville's population.

== Background ==
Unlike the plague of 1596–1602, which claimed 600,000 to 700,000 lives or a little under 8% of the population and initially struck northern and central Spain and Andalusia in the south, the Great Plague, which may have arisen in Algeria, struck the Mediterranean side of Spain first. The coastal city of Valencia was the first city to be hit, losing an estimated 30,000 people. The disease raged through Andalucía, in addition to sweeping the north into Catalonia and Aragon. The coast of Málaga lost upwards of 50,000 people. In Seville, quarantine measures were evaded, ignored, unproposed and/or unenforced. The results were devastating. The city of Seville and its rural districts were thought to have lost 150,000 people—starting with a total population of 600,000. Altogether Spain was thought to have lost 500,000 people, out of a population of slightly fewer than 10,000,000, or nearly 5% of its entire population. This was the greatest, but not the only, plague of 17th century Spain.

Almost 25 years later, another plague ravaged Spain. For nine years (1676–1685), great outbreaks of the disease attacked in waves across the country. It struck the areas of Andalucía and Valencia particularly hard. In conjunction with the poor harvest of 1682–83, which created famine conditions, the effects killed tens of thousands of the weakened and exhausted population. When it ended in 1685, it is estimated to have taken over 250,000 lives. This was the last outbreak of plague in Spain in the 17th century.

Three great plagues ravaged Spain in the 17th century. They were:

- The Plague of 1596–1602 (arrived in Santander by ship from northern Europe, most likely the Netherlands, then spread south through the center of Castile, reaching Madrid by 1599 and arriving in the southern city of Seville by 1600.)
- The Plague of 1646–1652 ("The Great Plague of Seville"; believed to have arrived by ship from Algeria, it was spread north by coastal shipping, afflicting towns and their hinterlands along the Mediterranean coast as far north as Barcelona.)
- The Plague of 1676–1685

Factoring in normal births, deaths, plus emigration, historians reckon the total cost in human lives due to these plagues throughout Spain, throughout the entire 17th century, to be a minimum of nearly 1.25 million. As a result, the population of Spain scarcely budged between the years 1596 and 1696.

The disease is generally believed to have been bubonic plague, an infection by the bacterium Yersinia pestis, transmitted via a rat vector. Other symptom patterns of the bubonic plague, such as septicemic plague and pneumonic plague, were also present.

== See also ==
- Second plague pandemic
- Great Plague of London
- Great Plague of Vienna
- Bubonic Plague
- Black Death in Spain
