= Human Fragility =

Painting by Salvator Rosa

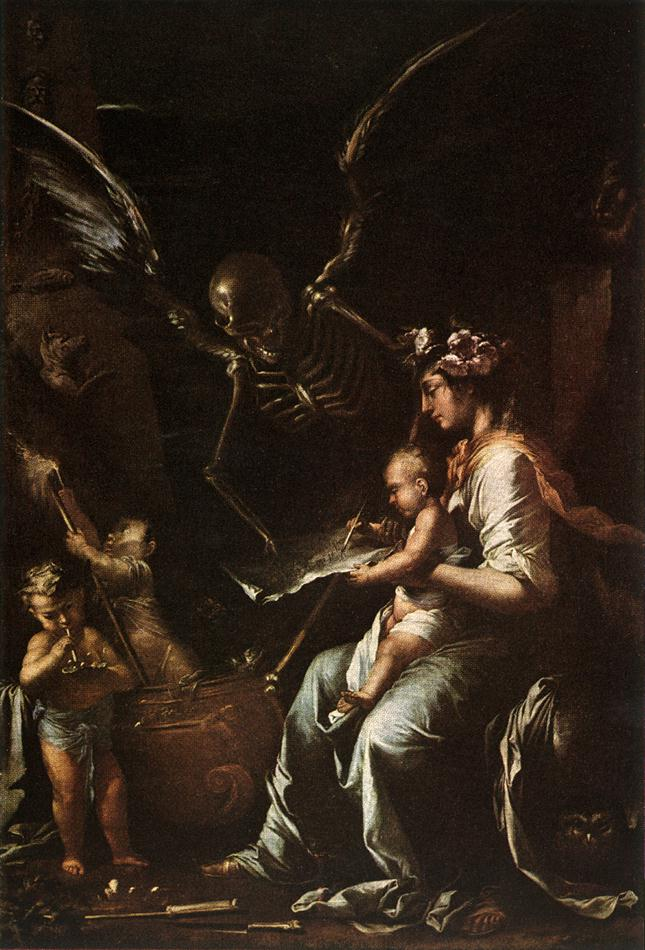
- Artist: Salvator Rosa
- Year: 1656
- Medium: Oil on canvas
- Dimensions: 197.4 cm × 131.5 cm (77.7 in × 51.8 in)
- Location: Fitzwilliam Museum; Cambridge

Human Fragility is an oil-on-canvas painting of 1656 by the Italian artist Salvator Rosa. It was painted during a plague in Naples; many of Rosa's relatives, including his son, brother, and sister, died. The painting is now in the Fitzwilliam Museum, Cambridge.

== History and description ==
The work depicts figures enacting an allegory: the seated woman is said to be Lucrezia, Rosa's mistress, and the young boy his son, wrist clenched by Death. The angel of death is manipulating the boy's hand to write "Conceptio Culpa, Nasci Pena, Labor Vita, Necesse Mori – 'Conception is a sin, Birth is a punishment, Life is toil, Death a necessity." The canvas is adorned with many foreboding indicia and memento mori(s) that remind the viewer that to be human is to be mortal. The ring of pale roses around the mother's head is probably an allusion to the family name. Salvator's own initials appear at the very bottom of the canvas, on the blade of the knife, a death symbol, the ruthless steel that has severed his family from him.
