= Naples Plague (1656) =

1656–58 epidemic of plague in the Kingdom of Naples

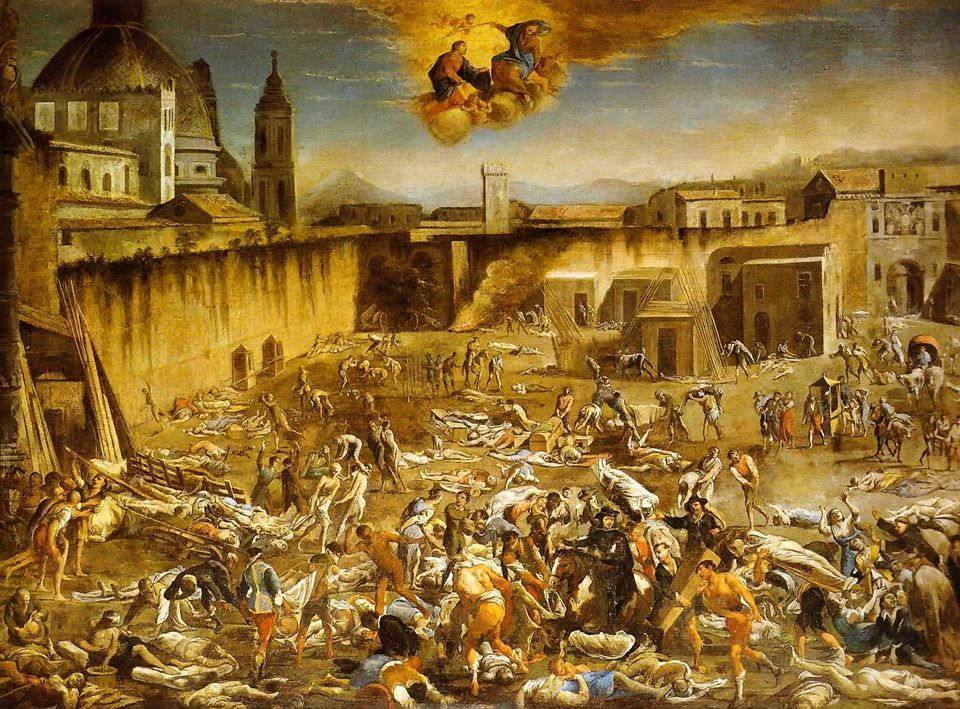
- Painting by Domenico Gargiulo, made during the first year of the outbreak
- Disease: Plague
- Source: From Sardinia in 1652, before that uncertain
- Dates: 1656–1658
- Deaths: Up to 1.25 million

The Naples Plague was an epidemic of plague in the Kingdom of Naples, lasting from 1656 to 1658. The epidemic affected mostly Central Italy and Southern Italy, killing up to 1,250,000 people throughout the Kingdom of Naples according to some estimates.

In the city of Naples alone, approximately 150,000–200,000 people died in 1656 due to the plague, accounting for more than half of the population. The epidemic had a severe impact on the economic and social structure of Naples and some other affected areas.

== History ==
In the 1640s, Spain experienced some serious plague outbreaks, such as Great Plague of Seville, which possibly came from Algiers. The plague spread to Sardinia (possibly from Spain or other European countries) in 1652, arriving in Naples in April 1656, and then spread to most part of southern Italy where the Kingdom of Naples was located. Only Sicily and parts of Calabria and Apulia were not affected.

To the north, the plague reached Rome in June 1656, and then affected most of the Papal State. The plague reached Umbria and Marche, but did not affect the Grand Duchy of Tuscany. It did, however, spread by sea to Liguria.

It came to a stop by forcible quarantine of the poorer districts, and the efforts of Martinus Ludheim, a visiting German physician from Bavaria. Santa Maria del Pianto was built to commemorate it in 1657.

== Death toll ==
It is estimated that the plague may have claimed up to 1,250,000 lives throughout the Kingdom of Naples, making it one of the deadliest epidemics in history. In Naples alone, around 150,000–200,000 people died in 1656, which accounted for at least half of the local population. The death toll in the Italian plagues took place during a single, relatively massive, wave in each city which increased the impact of these deaths. In Barletta, 7,000–12,000 people died, out of the original 20,000 population.

Outside the Kingdom of Naples, in Rome (capital of the Papal State), around 23,000 people (or 19% of the local population) perished. In Genoa, approximately 60,000 people died due to the epidemic, accounting for 60% of the local population. Outside of Italy, Spain suffered about 1,250,000 losses or about 19% of their population (this includes deaths from the 1599 outbreak).

== Economic impact ==
During the seventeenth century, the economies of the Italian region were facing intense competition from northern Europe due to the Atlantic slave trade. In the mid seventeenth centuries, the economies of Italy were still reeling from the 1629-1631 Italian Plague in the north. Research suggests that Italy was impacted much more severely by plague than the more northern parts of Europe due to the higher urban mortality rates and more importantly, a greater ability of plague to affect rural areas. Damage to the rural areas of Italy would destroy the surplus of manpower and supplies traditionally produced in the countryside, therefore curbing the capacity for urban recovery. This was a characteristic unique to both seventeenth century Italian plagues. It is debated whether these plagues were a net positive or negative to the Italian economies of the seventeenth century.

== See also ==
- First plague pandemic, including the late 8th century plague of Naples
- Second plague pandemic (14th-19th century)
- 1629–1631 Italian plague
- Third plague pandemic (1855–1960)
- List of epidemics
