= Santa Maria del Pianto, Naples =

Italian church

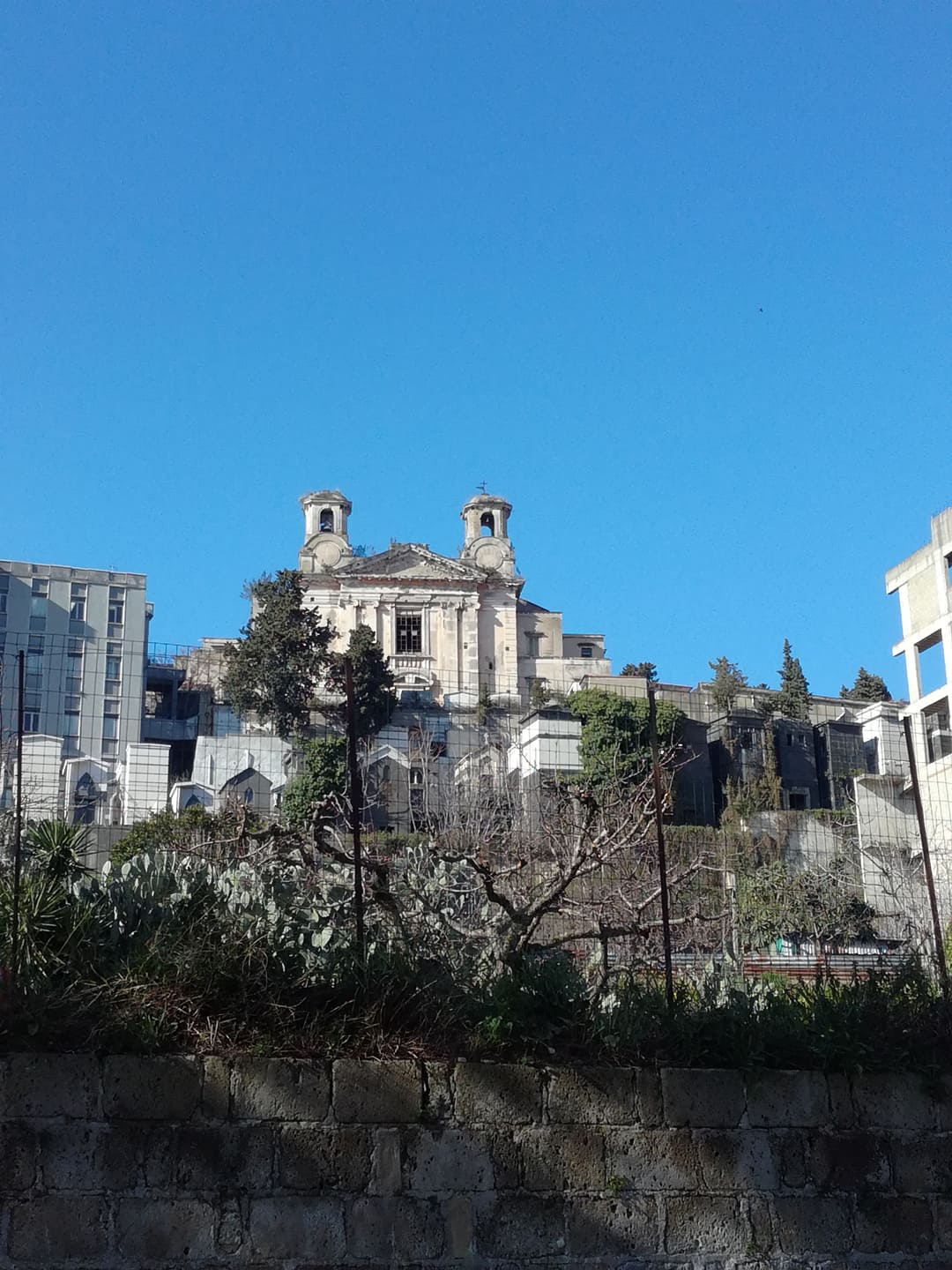

Santa Maria del Pianto ("Holy Mary of Weeping") is a church in Naples, Italy. Designed by Francesco Antonio Picchiatti, it was built in 1657 to commemorate the victims of the 1656 plague, who are buried in the nearby Grotta degli Sportiglioni. Its site, which also houses a cemetery of its own, was the original core of the Cemetery of Poggioreale on Via vicinale di Santa Maria del Pianto.
