= Second plague pandemic =

Series of plague epidemics

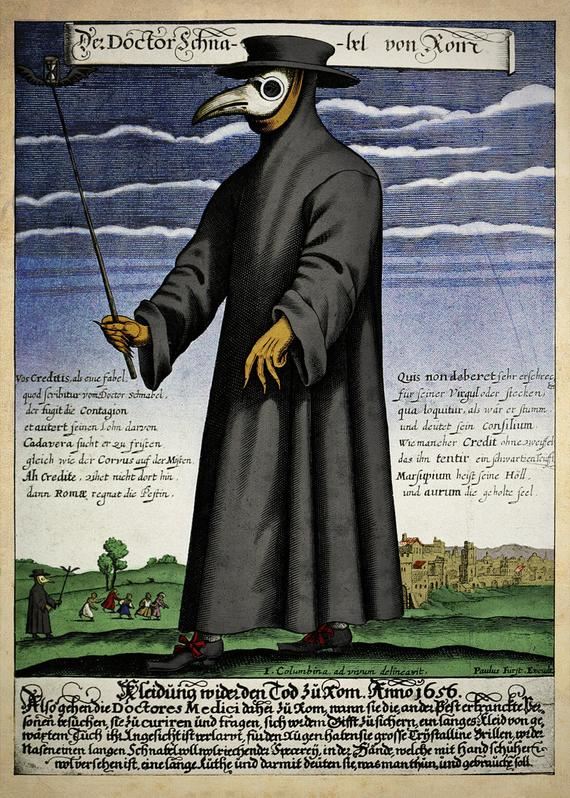
A plague doctor and his typical apparel during the 17th century

The second plague pandemic was a major series of epidemics of plague that started with the Black Death, which reached medieval Europe in 1346 and killed up to half of the population of Eurasia in the next four years. It followed the first plague pandemic that began in the 6th century with the Plague of Justinian, which ended in the 8th century. Although the plague died out in most places after 1353, it became endemic and recurred regularly. A series of major epidemics occurred in the late 17th century, and the disease recurred in some places until the late 18th century or the early 19th century. After this, a new strain of the bacterium gave rise to the third plague pandemic, which started in Asia around the mid-19th century.

By the early 19th century, the threat of plague had diminished, though it was quickly replaced by the spread of another deadly infectious disease in the first cholera pandemic, beginning in 1817, the first of several cholera pandemics to sweep through Asia and Europe during the 19th and 20th centuries. One of the last epidemics to strike the Balkans during the second plague pandemic was Caragea's plague, between 1813 and 1814. The Swiss explorer Johann Ludwig Burckhardt witnessed the plague epidemics that ravaged Hejaz and Egypt between 1812 and 1816. He wrote: "In five or six days after my arrival [in Yanbu] the mortality increased; forty or fifty persons died in a day, which, in a population of five or six thousand, was a terrible mortality." Malta had its second most severe plague epidemic in the epidemic of 1813–1814, which killed around 4,500 people.

Plague is caused by the bacterium Yersinia pestis, which exists in parasitic fleas of several species in the wild and of rats in human society. In an outbreak, it may kill all of its immediate hosts and thus die out, but it can remain active in other hosts that it does not kill, thereby causing a new outbreak years or decades later.

== Overview ==
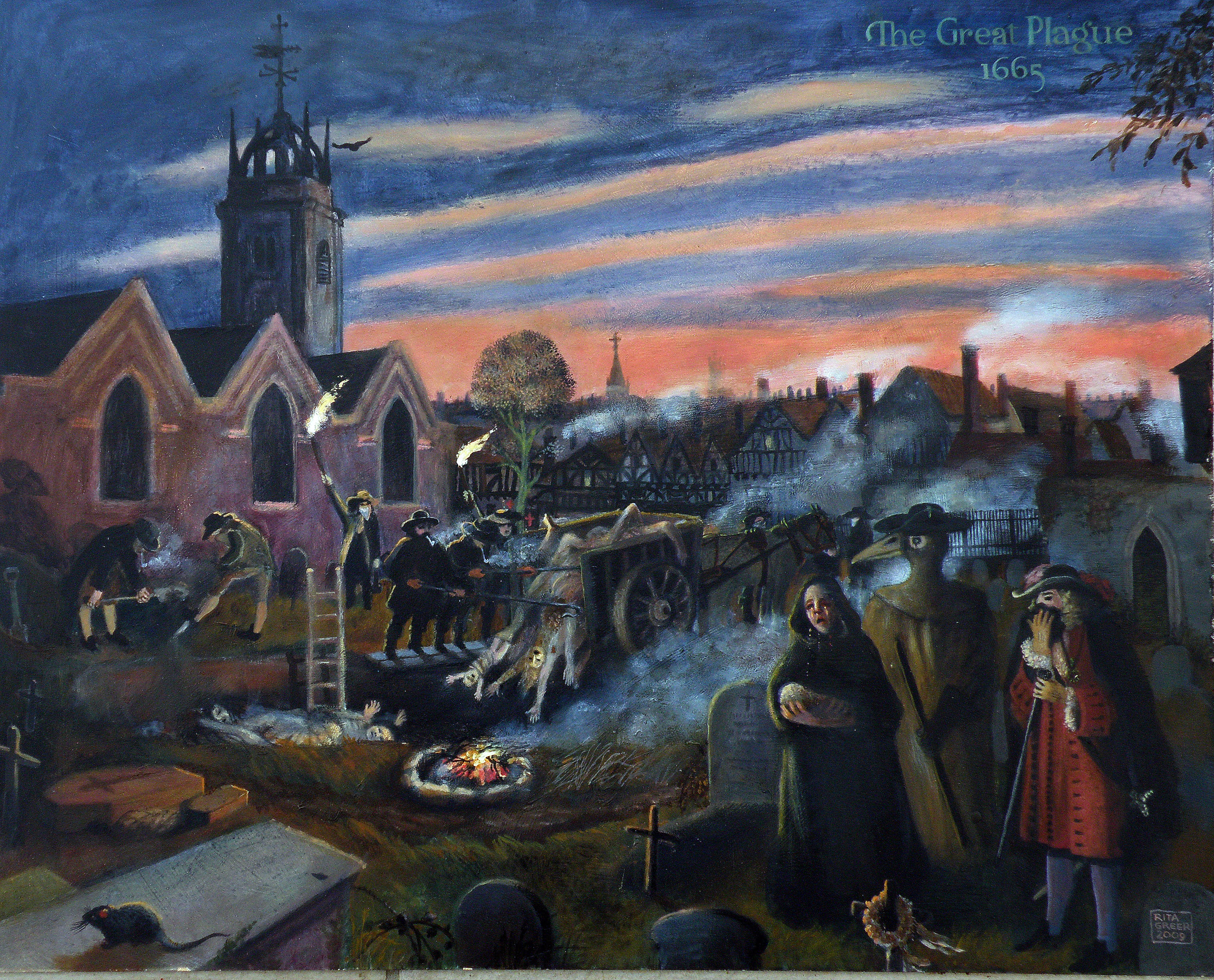
Great Plague of London in 1665

There have been three major outbreaks of plague. The Plague of Justinian in the 6th and 7th centuries is the first known attack on record, and marks the first firmly recorded pattern of plague. From historical descriptions, as much as 40% of the population of Constantinople died from the plague. Modern estimates suggest that half of Europe's population died as a result of this first plague pandemic before it disappeared in the 8th century. After 750, plague did not appear again in Europe until the Black Death of the 14th century.

The second pandemic's origins are disputed; it originated either in Central Asia or Crimea, and appeared in Crimea by 1347. It may have reduced the world population from an estimated 450 million to 350–375 million by the year 1400. Evidence for Yersinia pestis was found in the teeth of early plague victims in the Tian Shan Mountains, now northern Kyrgyzstan, indicating a likely origin of that iteration of the plague.

The plague returned at intervals with varying virulence and mortality until the early 19th century. In England, for example, the plague returned between 1360 and 1363, killing 20% of Londoners, and then again in 1369, killing 10–15%.

In the 16th century, the Plague hit San Cristóbal de La Laguna in the Canary Islands between 1582 and 1583.

In the 17th century, there were a series of European "great plague" outbreaks: the Great Plague of Seville between 1647 and 1652, the Great Plague of London between 1665 and 1666, and the Great Plague of Vienna in 1679. The Great Plague in the late Ming dynasty arose in Shanxi in 1633 and arrived at Beijing in 1641, contributing to the downfall of the Ming Dynasty in 1644.

In the 18th century, there was the Great Plague of Marseille, which took place between 1720 and 1722; the Great Plague of 1738, which occurred in Eastern Europe between 1738 and 1740; and the Russian plague of 1770–1772, which took place in Central Russia and particularly affected Moscow. However, the plague in its virulent form seemed to gradually disappear from Europe, though lingering in Egypt and the Middle East.

By the early 19th century, the threat of plague had diminished, though it was quickly replaced by the spread of another deadly infectious disease in the first cholera pandemic, beginning in 1817, the first of several cholera pandemics to sweep through Asia and Europe during the 19th and 20th centuries.

The third plague pandemic hit China in the 1890s and devastated India. While it was largely contained in the East, it became endemic in the western United States, where sporadic outbreaks of plague continue to occur.

== Black Death ==
Spread of the Black Death through Europe 1346-1353

Arab historians Ibn al-Wardi and Al-Maqrizi believed the Black Death originated in Mongolia, and Chinese records show a huge outbreak in Mongolia in the early 1330s.

In the 21st century, more research has emerged that shows the Black Death most likely originated on the northwestern shores of the Caspian Sea, and may not even have reached India and China, as research on the Delhi Sultanate and the Yuan Dynasty showed no evidence of any serious epidemic in 14th-century India and no specific evidence of plague in 14th-century China.

There were large epidemics in China in 1331 and between 1351 and 1354 in the provinces of Hebei, Shanxi, and others, which are considered to have killed between 50% and 90% of the local populations, with numbers running into the tens of millions. However, there is no proof that these were caused by plague, though there are indications for the second set of epidemics.

Plague was reportedly introduced to Europe via Genoese traders from their port city of Kaffa in Crimea in 1347. During the protracted Siege of Caffa, between 1345 and 1346, the Mongol Golden Horde army of Jani Beg, whose mainly Tatar troops were suffering from the disease, catapulted infected corpses over the city walls of Kaffa to infect the inhabitants, though it is more likely that infected rats travelling across the siege lines spread the epidemic to the inhabitants. As the disease took hold, Genoese traders fled across the Black Sea to Constantinople, where the disease first arrived in Europe in summer 1347. The epidemic there killed the 13-year-old son of the Byzantine emperor, John VI Kantakouzenos, who wrote a description of the disease modelled on Thucydides' account of the 5th-century BCE Plague of Athens, noting the spread of the Black Death by ship between maritime cities. Nicephorus Gregoras also described in writing to Demetrios Kydones the rising death toll, the futility of medicine against it, and the panic of the citizens.

It arrived at Genoa and Venice in January 1348, while simultaneously spreading through Asia Minor and into Egypt. The bubonic form was described graphically in Florence in The Decameron and Guy de Chauliac also described the pneumonic form at Avignon. It rapidly spread to France and Spain and, by 1349, was in England. By 1350–1351, it was afflicting Eastern Europe and had reached Russia in 1352–1353.

The 14th-century eruption of the Black Death had a drastic effect on Europe's population, irrevocably changing its social structures, and resulted in the widespread persecution of minorities such as Jews, foreigners, beggars, and lepers. The uncertainty of daily survival has been seen as creating a general mood of morbidity, influencing people to "live for the moment", as illustrated by Giovanni Boccaccio in The Decameron (1353). Petrarch, noting the unparalleled and unbelievable extremity of the disease's effects, wrote that "happy posterity, who will not experience such abysmal woe ... will look upon our testimony as a fable".

== Recurrences ==
The second pandemic spread throughout Eurasia and the Mediterranean Basin. The plague repeatedly returned to haunt Europe and the Mediterranean Basin throughout the 16th to 17th centuries. The plague ravaged much of the Islamic world. Plague was present in at least one location in the Islamic world virtually every year between 1500 and 1850. According to Jean-Noel Biraben, plague was present somewhere in Europe in every year between 1346 and 1671. According to Ellen Schiferl, between 1400 and 1600, there was a plague epidemic recorded in at least one part of Europe for every year except 1445.

=== Byzantine Empire and Ottoman Empire ===
In the Byzantine Empire, the 1347 Black Death outbreak in Constantinople lasted a year. The plague recurred ten times before 1400. Plague was repeatedly reintroduced to the city because of its strategic location between the Mediterranean Sea and the Black Sea, and between Europe and Asia, as well as its position as the imperial capital.

Constantinople retained its imperial status at the centre of the Ottoman Empire after the Fall of Constantinople to Mehmed the Conqueror in 1453. Approximately 1–2% of the city's population died annually of plague. Especially severe episodes were recorded by the Ottoman historians Mustafa Âlî and Hora Saadettin between 1491 and 1503, with 1491 through 1493 being the most afflicted years. Plague returned in 1511 until 1514 and, after 1520, was endemic in the city until 1529. Plague was endemic in Constantinople again between 1533 and 1549, 1552 and 1567, and for most of the remaining 16th-century.

In the 17th century, plague epidemics within Constantinople were noted in the following years: 1603, 1611 to 1613, 1647 to 1649, 1653 to 1656, 1659 to 1688, 1671 to 1680, 1685 to 1695, and 1697 to 1701.

In the 18th century, there were 64 years in which plague broke out in the capital, and a further 30 plague years which occurred in the first half of the 19th century. Of these later 94 plague epidemics in Constantinople between 1700 and 1850, six of them—occurring in 1705, 1726, 1751, 1778, 1812, and 1836—are estimated to have killed more than 5% of the population, whereas 83 of the epidemics killed 1% or fewer.

Plague repeatedly struck the cities of North Africa. Between 1620 and 1621, Algiers lost 30,000–50,000 people to it, with outbreaks returning in 1654 to 1657, 1665, 1691, and 1740 to 1742.

Plague remained a major event in Ottoman society until the second quarter of the 19th century. Between 1701 and 1750, 37 large-scale and smaller epidemics were recorded in Constantinople, with a further 31 occurring between 1751 and 1800. The Great Plague of 1738 affected Ottoman territory in the Balkans, lasting until 1740.

Baghdad suffered severely from visitations of the plague, with outbreaks reducing the population to one-third of its size by 1781.

One of the last epidemics to strike the Balkans during the second plague pandemic was Caragea's plague, between 1813 and 1814.

Swiss explorer Johann Ludwig Burckhardt witnessed the plague epidemics that ravaged Hejaz and Egypt between 1812 and 1816. He wrote: "In five or six days after my arrival [in Yanbu] the mortality increased; forty or fifty persons died in a day, which, in a population of five or six thousand, was a terrible mortality."

=== Holy Roman Empire ===
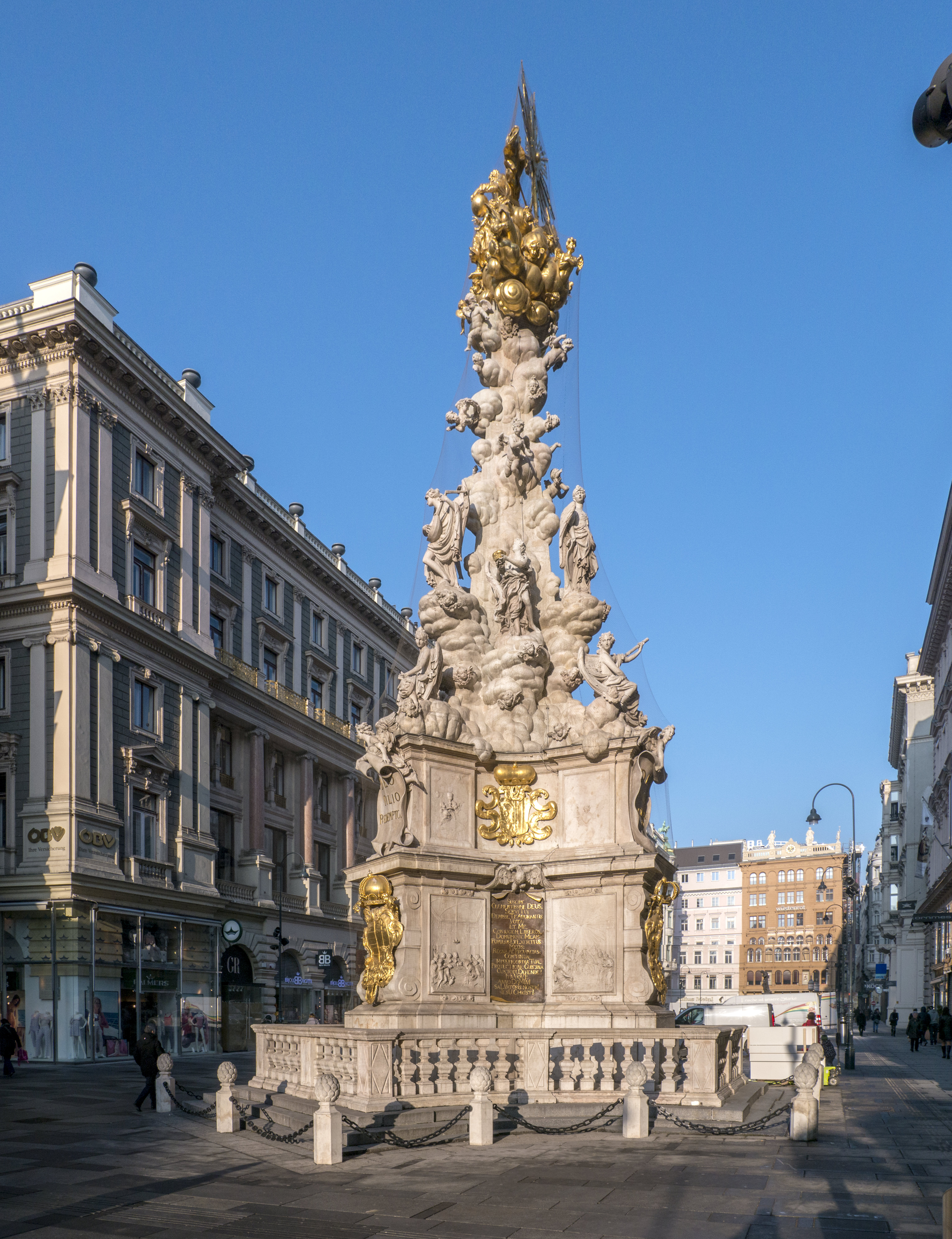
Plague Column in Vienna was erected after the Great Plague epidemic in 1679

Although regular outbreaks of disease were common for decades prior to 1618, the Thirty Years' War (1618–48) greatly accelerated their spread. Based on local records, military action accounted for less than 3% of civilian deaths; the major causes were starvation (12%) and bubonic plague (64%). The modern consensus is that the population of the Holy Roman Empire declined from 18 to 20 million in 1600 to 11–13 million in 1650, and did not regain pre-war levels until 1750.

The Great Plague of Vienna struck Vienna, the dynastic seat of the Holy Roman Empire, in 1679, killing an estimated 76,000 people. Emperor Leopold I fled the city upon the outbreak. He vowed to erect a Marian Column in thanksgiving if the plague would end. Vienna's Plague Column, located on the Graben, was commissioned in 1683 and inaugurated in 1694.

=== Italian Peninsula ===
By 1357, the plague had returned to Venice, and from 1361 to 1363, the rest of Italy experienced the first recurrence of the pandemic. Pisa, Pistoia and Florence in Tuscany were especially badly affected; there pesta secunda, 'second pestilence' killed a fifth of the population. In the pesta tertia, 'third pestilence' of 1369 to 1371, 10–15% died.

Survivors were aware that the Black Death of 1347–51 was not a unique event and that life was now "far more frightening and precarious than before". The Italian peninsula was struck with an outbreak of plague in 68% of the years between 1348 and 1600. There were 22 outbreaks of plague in Venice between 1361 and 1528. Petrarch, writing to Giovanni Boccaccio in September 1363, lamented that while the Black Death's arrival in Italy in 1348 had been mourned as an unprecedented disaster, "Now we realize that it is only the beginning of our mourning, for since then this evil force, unequalled and unheard of in human annals through the centuries, has never ceased, striking everywhere on all sides, on the left and right, like a skilled warrior."

In the Jubilee Year of 1400, announced by Pope Boniface IX, one of the most severe occurrences of plague was exacerbated by the many pilgrims making their way to and from Rome; in the city itself 600–800 died daily. As recorded by the undertakers' records in Florence, at least 10,406 people died; the total death toll was estimated at twice that figure by 15th-century chronicler Giovanni Morelli. Half of the population of Pistoia and its hinterland were killed that year.

Another outbreak occurred in Padua in 1405 and claimed 18,000 lives. In the plague epidemic of 1449–52, 30,000 Milanese died in 1451 alone.

A particularly deadly plague struck Italy between 1478 and 1482. The territories of the Republic of Venice saw 300,000 dead in the epidemic's eight-year course. Luca Landucci wrote in 1478 that the citizens of Florence "were in a sorry plight. They lived in dread, and no one had any heart to work. The poor creatures could not procure silk or wool ... so that all classes suffered." In addition to plague, Florence was suffering both from excommunication leading to war with the Papal States and from the political strife following the Pazzi conspiracy.

In 1479, the plague broke out in Rome; Bartolomeo Platina, the head of the Vatican Library was killed, and Pope Sixtus IV fled the city and was absent for more than a year. Federico da Montefeltro, Duke of Urbino, also died.

Following the Sack of Rome in 1527 by Charles V, Holy Roman Emperor, plague broke out in both Rome and Florence. The plague emerged in Rome and killed 30,000 Florentines—a quarter of the city's inhabitants. The Description of the Plague at Florence in the Year 1527, by Lorenzo di Filippo Strozzi, records this plague in detail; it was copied out by Niccolò Machiavelli with annotations by Strozzi. He wrote:

Our pitiful Florence now looks like nothing but a town which has been stormed by infidels and then forsaken. One part of the inhabitants ... have retired to distant country houses, one part is dead, and yet another part is dying. Thus the present is torment, the future menace, so we contend with death and only live in fear and trembling. The clean, fine streets which formerly teemed with rich and noble citizens are now stinking and dirty; crowds of beggars drag themselves through them with anxious groans and only with difficulty and dread can one pass them. Shops and inns are closed, at the factories work has ceased, the law courts are empty, the laws are trampled on. Now one hears of some theft, now of some murder. The squares, the market places on which citizens used frequently to assemble, have now been converted into graves and into the resort of the wicked rabble. ... If by chance relations meet, a brother, a sister, a husband, a wife, they carefully avoid each other. What further words are needed? Fathers and mothers avoid their own children and forsake them. ... A few provision stores are still open, where bread is distributed, but where in the crush plague boils are also spread. Instead of conversation ... one hears now only pitiful, mournful tidings – such a one is dead, such a one is sick, such a one has fled, such a one is interned in his house, such a one is in hospital, such a one has nurses, another is without aid, such like news which by imagination alone would suffice to make Aesculapius sick.

— Lorenzo di Filippo Strozzi, Description of the Plague at Florence in the Year 1527

Further plague epidemics accompanied the Siege of Florence in 1529; there, religious buildings became hospitals and 600 temporary structures were built to house the infected outside the city walls.

After 1530, political strife calmed and warfare in Italy became less frequent. Subsequently, plague outbreaks became more rare, affecting only individual cities or regions, but were particularly severe. In the 43 years between 1533 and 1575, there were 18 epidemics of plague. The especially damaging Italian plague of 1575–78 travelled both north and southwards through the peninsula from either end; the death toll was particularly high. By official reckoning, Milan lost 17,329 to plague in 1576, while Brescia recorded 17,396 killed in a town that did not exceed 46,000 total inhabitants. Venice, meanwhile, saw between a quarter and a third of its population die of plague in the epidemic of 1576–77 with 50,000 deaths.

In the first half of the 17th century, a plague claimed some 1.7 million victims in Italy, or about 14% of the population.

The Great Plague of Milan (1629–31) was possibly the most disastrous of the century: the city of Milan lost half its population of about 100,000, while Venice was as afflicted as in its severe 1553–56 outbreak.

The Italian Plague of 1656–57 was the last major catastrophic plague in Italy, with the Naples Plague the most severe. In 1656, the plague killed about half of Naples's 300,000 inhabitants.

Messina saw the last epidemic in Italy, in 1742–44. The final recorded incidence of plague in Italy was in 1815–16, when plague broke out in Noja, a town near Bari.

=== Northern Europe ===
Over 60% of Norway's population died from 1348 to 1350. The last plague outbreak ravaged Oslo in 1654.

In 1709–13, a plague epidemic followed the start of the Great Northern War (1700–1721), between Sweden and Russia and its allies, killing about 100,000 in Sweden and 300,000 in Prussia. The plague killed two-thirds of the inhabitants of Helsinki, and claimed a third of Stockholm's population. This was the last plague in Scandinavia, but the Russian plague of 1770–1772 killed up to 100,000 people in Moscow.

=== Eastern Europe ===
In Russia, the disease hit somewhere once every five or six years from 1350 to 1490. In 1654, the Russian plague killed about 700,000 inhabitants.

In the 1560s, a European wave of the plague first hit Lithuania and Russian Pskov in 1564–1565, but did not progress further east until 1566, when it ravaged in Russian lands already suffering from the Livonian War and the oprichnina. It made a pause until hitting even harder in two waves in 1569–1570 and 1571–1572, which, combined with concurrent famine, may have killed between a third and a quarter of the Russian population.

The Great Plague of 1738 was a pandemic of plague lasting 1738–1740 and affecting areas in the modern nations of Romania, Hungary, Ukraine, Serbia, Croatia, and Austria. The Russian plague epidemic of 1770–1772 killed as many as 100,000 people in Moscow alone, with thousands more dying in the surrounding countryside.

=== France ===
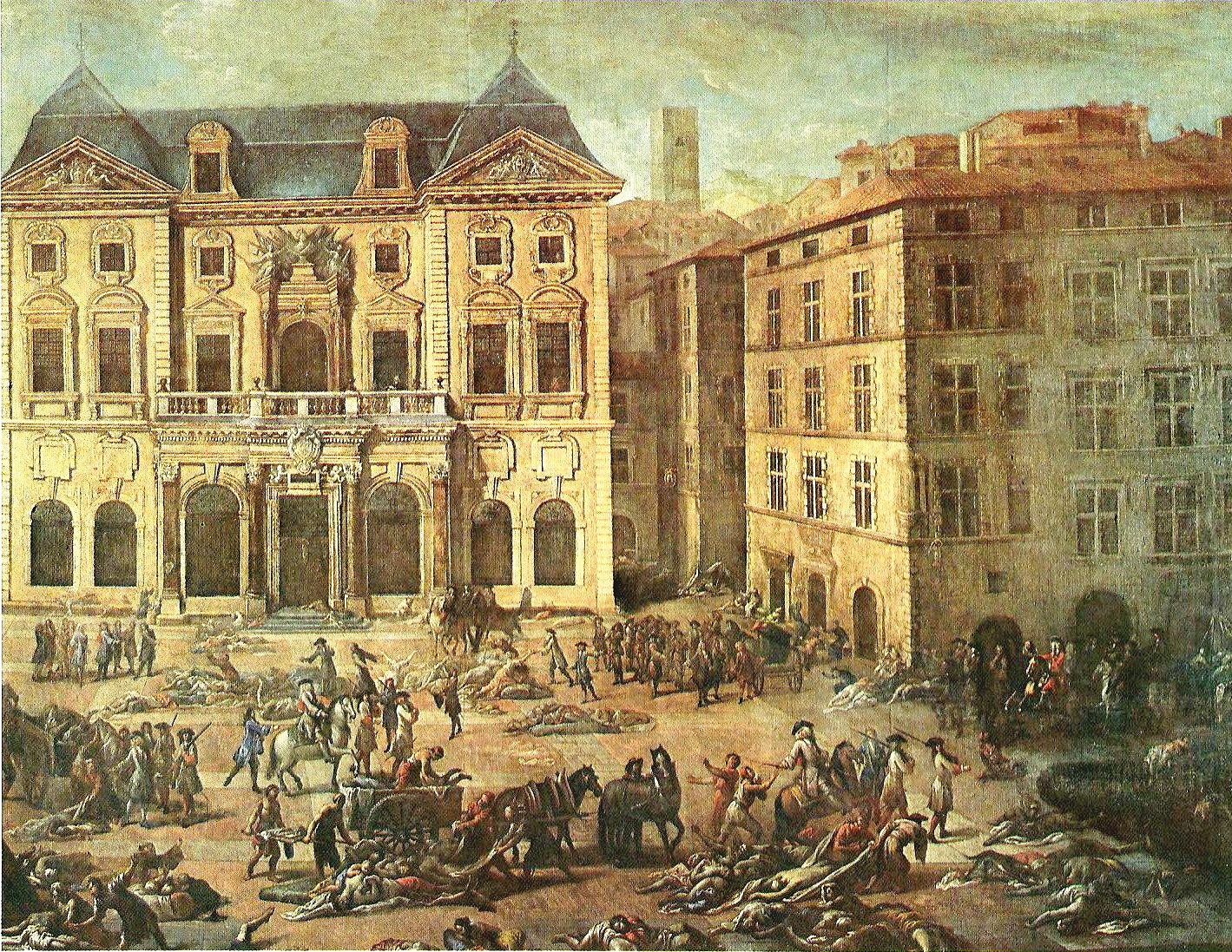
The Great Plague of Marseille in 1720 killed 100,000 people in the city and the surrounding provinces.

In 1466, perhaps 40,000 people died of plague in Paris. During the 16th and 17th centuries, plague visited Paris nearly once every three years on average. According to historian Geoffrey Parker, "France alone lost almost a million people to plague in the epidemic of 1628–31." Western Europe's last major epidemic occurred in 1720 in Marseilles.

=== Britain ===
Plague epidemics ravaged London in the 1563 London plague, in 1593, 1603, 1625, 1636, and 1665, reducing its population by 10 to 30% during those years. The 1665–66 Great Plague of London was the final major epidemic of the pandemic, with the last death of plague in the walled City of London recorded fourteen years later in 1679.

=== Low Countries ===
Over 10% of Amsterdam's population died in 1623–25, and again in 1635–36, 1655, and 1664.

=== Iberia ===
More than 1.25 million deaths resulted from the extreme incidence of plague in 17th-century Spain. The plague of 1649 probably reduced the population of Seville by half.

=== Malta ===
Malta suffered from a number of plague outbreaks during the second pandemic between the mid-14th and early 19th centuries. The most severe outbreak was the epidemic of 1675–1676, which killed around 11,300 people, followed by the epidemic of 1813–1814 and that of 1592–1593, which killed around 4,500 and 3,000 people respectively.

=== Tenerife ===
The 1582 Tenerife plague epidemic (also 1582 San Cristóbal de La Laguna plague epidemic) was an outbreak of bubonic plague that occurred between 1582 and 1583 on the island of Tenerife, Spain. It is currently believed to have caused between 5,000 and 9,000 deaths on an island with fewer than 20,000 inhabitants at that time (approximately 25-45% of the island's population).

== Impact in Africa ==
Historians have only recently begun to study the impact of the bubonic plague in Africa. The disease severely disrupted trade networks in West Africa, depopulating major sites such as Kirikongo in Burkina Faso and Akrokrowa in Ghana.

== Major outbreaks ==
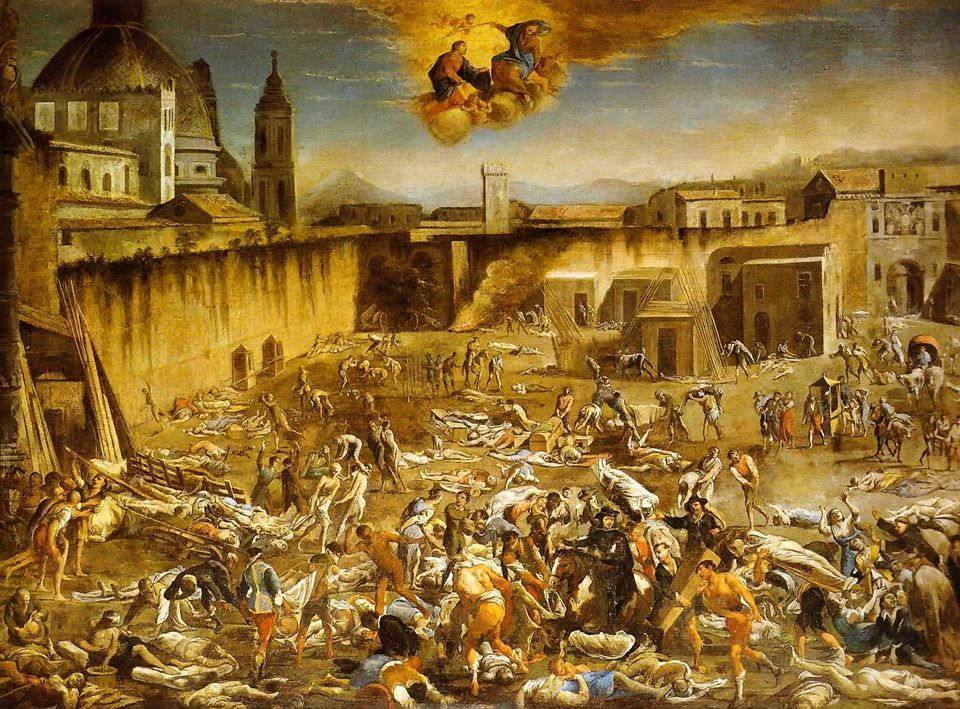
Contemporary engraving of Naples during the Naples Plague in 1656

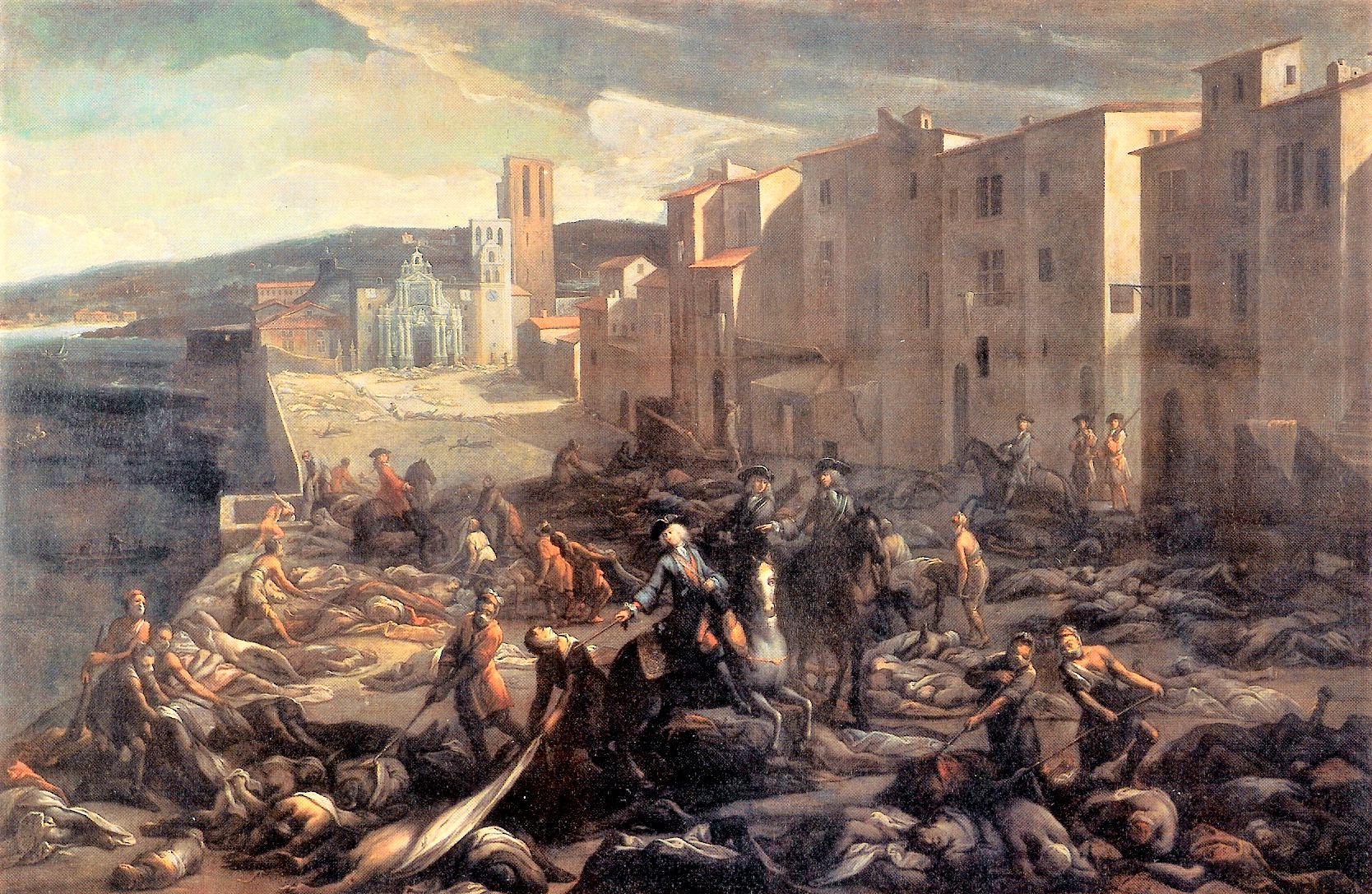
Contemporary engraving of Marseille during the Great Plague in 1720

Years	Place	Death estimates	Article/citation
1347–51	Europe, Asia, Middle East	75,000,000–200,000,000	Black Death
1360–63	England	700–800,000	Black Death in England
1464–66	Paris	40,000	
1471	England	300–400,000	
1479–80	England	400–500,000	
1563–64	England	20,136+	1563 London plague
1576–77	Venice	50,000	
1582–83	Tenerife	5,000–9,000	
1592–93	England	19,900+	1592–1593 London plague
1596–99	Castile	500,000	
1603–11	London	43,000	
1620–21	Algiers	30–50,000	
1628–31	France	1,000,000	
1629–31	Italy	1,000,000	Italian plague of 1629–31
1633–44	China (Ming dynasty)	200,000+	Great Plague in the late Ming dynasty
1647–52	Southern Spain	500,000	Great Plague of Seville
1654–55	Russia	700,000	
1656–58	Kingdom of Naples	1,250,000	Naples Plague
1665–66	London	70–100,000	Great Plague of London
1675–76	Malta	11,300	1675–76 Malta plague epidemic
1679–80	Austria	76,000	Great Plague of Vienna
1681	Prague	83,000	
1689–90	Baghdad	150,000	
1704–10	Poland	75,000	Great Northern War plague outbreak
1709–13	Baltic	300–400,000	Great Northern War plague outbreak
1720s	Marseille	100,000	Great Plague of Marseille
1738–40	Hungary & Croatia	50,000	Great Plague of 1738
1770s	Moscow	75,000	Russian plague of 1770–72
1772–1773	Persian Empire	2,000,000	1772–1773 Persian Plague
1791	Egypt	300,000	
1812–19	Ottoman Empire	300,000	1812–1819 Ottoman plague epidemic
1813–14	Malta	4,500	1813–14 Malta plague epidemic
1813–14	Romania	60,000	Caragea's plague
1829–35	Baghdad	12,000	

== Disappearance ==
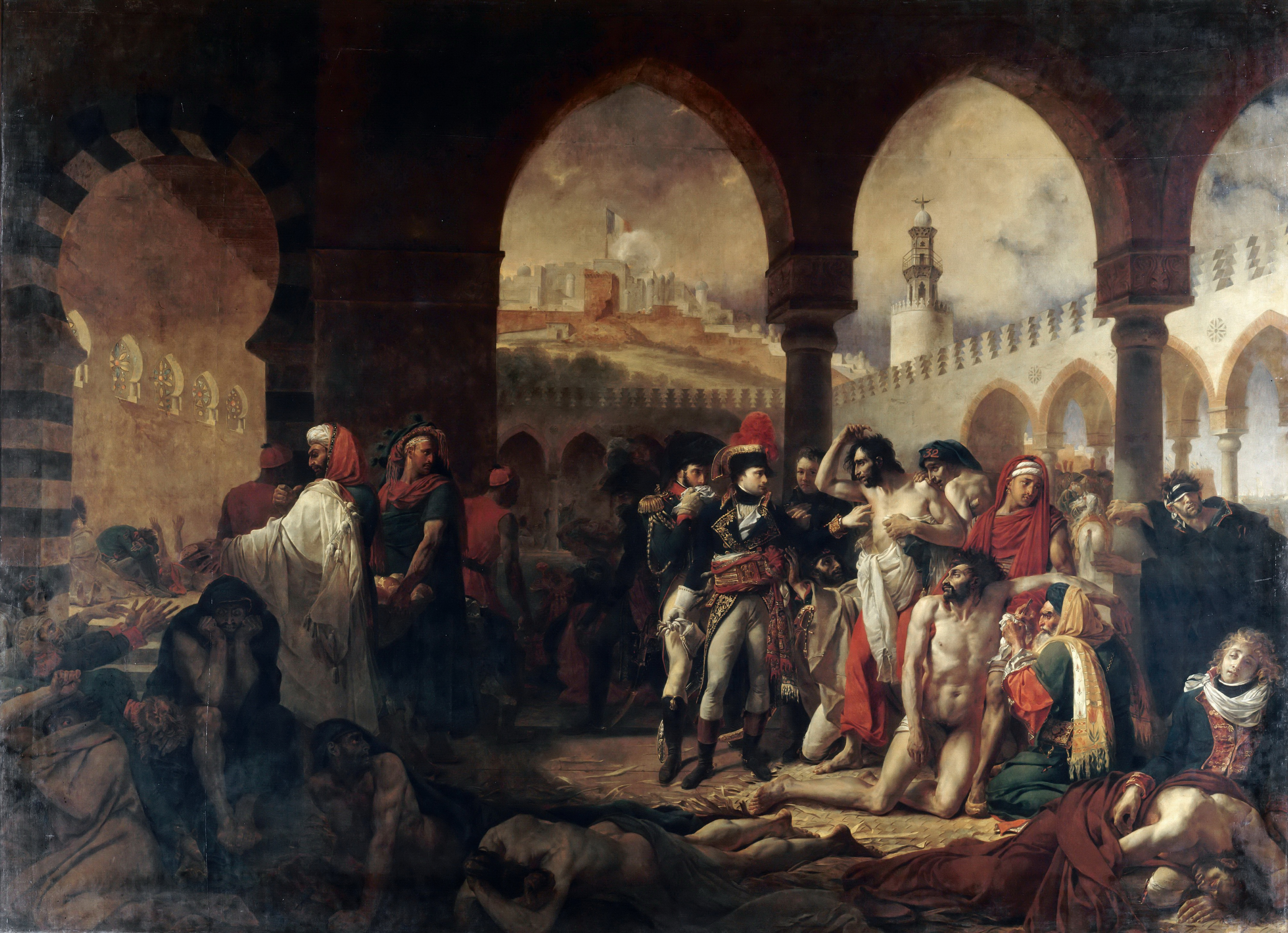
1804 painting of Napoleon visiting plague victims in Jaffa on 11 March 1799

The 18th- and 19th-century outbreaks, though severe, marked the retreat of the pandemic from most of Europe (18th century), northern Africa, and the Near East (19th century). The pandemic died out progressively across Europe. One documented case was in 17th-century London, where the first proper demographer, John Graunt, failed by just five years to see the last recorded death from plague, which happened in 1679, 14 years after the Great Plague of London. The reasons it died out totally are not well understood. It is tempting to think that the Great Fire of London the next year destroyed the hiding places of the rats in the roofs. There was not a single recorded plague death "within the walls" after 1666. However, by this time, the city had spread well beyond the walls, which contained most of the fire, and most plague cases happened beyond the limits of the fire. Likely more significant was that all buildings after the fire were constructed of brick rather than wood and other flammable materials.

This pattern was broadly followed after major epidemics in northern Italy (1631), southern and eastern Spain (1652), southern Italy and Genoa (1657), and Paris (1668).

Appleby considers six possible explanations:

1. People developed immunity.
2. Improvements in nutrition made people more resistant.
3. Improvements in housing, urban sanitation and personal cleanliness reduced the number of rats and rat fleas.
4. The dominant rat species changed. (The brown rat did not arrive in London until 1727.)
5. Quarantine methods improved in the 17th century.
6. Some rats developed immunity, so fleas never left them in droves to humans; non-resistant rats were eliminated and this broke the cycle.

Synder suggests that the replacement of the Black rat (Rattus rattus), which thrived among people and was frequently kept as a pet, by the more aggressive and prolific Norway or brown rat (Rattus norvegicus) was a major factor. The Brown rat, which arrived as an invasive species from the East, is skittish and avoids human contact, and its aggressive and asocial behaviour made it less attractive to humans. As the Brown rat violently drove out the Black rat in country after country, becoming the dominant species in that ecological niche, rat-to-human contact declined, as did the opportunities for plague to pass from rat fleas to humans. One of the major demarcations for hot spots in the third plague pandemic was the places where the Black rat had yet to be replaced, such as Bombay (now Mumbai) in India.

It has also been suggested that evolutionary processes may have favoured less virulent strains of the pathogen Yersinia pestis.

In all probability, almost all of these factors had some effect in bringing about the end of the pandemic, though the main cause may never be conclusively determined. The disappearance happened rather later in the Nordic and eastern European countries, but there was a similar halt after major epidemics.

== See also ==
- Timeline of plague
- First plague pandemic (541–767)
- Black Death
