= Gustav Orreus =

- Born: 1738; Finland (then part of Sweden)
- Died: 1811 (aged 72–73); Saint Petersburg
- Occupation: Doctor of Medicine

Gustav Orreus (1738–1811) was a doctor of Finnish-Swedish origin in the Imperial Russian service. An early epidemiologist, Orreus distinguished himself during the Russian plague of 1770–72. He was the first Doctor of Medicine ever to qualify in Russia.

== Biography ==
Born in Finland (then part of Sweden), Orreus was trained at Åbo and relocated to Russia in 1755. He continued medical training in Moscow and is believed to have taken part in the Seven Years' War. On August 2, 1768 Catherine II of Russia awarded him the Doctor of Medicine diploma, the first of its kind ever issued in Russia.

In the same year Orreus became a surgeon at Pyotr Rumyantsev's headquarters in the Moldavian theater of the 1768-1774 Russo-Turkish War. The southern provinces of Moldavia and Wallachia were infested with plague. Orreus, in charge of disease prevention, persuaded the generals that the disease was indeed plague and not "malignant fever"; he set up basic reconnaissance for plague outbreaks and imposed anti-plague controls that are credited with preventing widespread disease among the troops. However the plague infiltrated mainland Russia, causing the epidemic of 1770–72 that peaked in Moscow in September and October 1771. Orreus was summoned to Moscow by Grigory Orlov, the statesman placed in charge of emergency anti-plague action. Orlov and Orreus arrived in the city September 26, 1771, at the peak of the outbreak. Orreus was assigned to manage quarantine hospitals in Moscow. At first, he opposed Afanasy Shafonsky and denied the plague nature of the Moscow epidemic, but despite bitter medical dispute the course of events persuaded Orreus to admit the facts. He summarized his experience during the plague in a 1784 treatise Descriptio pestis, quae anno 1770 in Jassia et 1771 in Moscua grassata est (A Description of Plague that Ravaged Iaşi in 1770 and Moscow in 1771).

In 1776 Orreus retired from state service and settled on his estate near Saint Petersburg. His experiments with agricultural novelties were publicized in the Proceeds of the Free Economic Society. He also authored A Brief Essay on Fever, Diarrhea and Bloody Flux and other Diseases Prevalent among Soldiers, printed in the Russian language at Saint Petersburg in 1808.

== Notes ==
- Klyuzhev, V. M.; et al. (2006). "Veliky Pyotr reshil ... (Великий Пётр решил...)" (PDF). Voyenno-istorichesky Journal (in Russian) (5): 51–56.
- Melikishvili, Alexander (2006). "Genesis of the anti-plague system: the Tsarist period" (PDF). Critical Reviews in Microbiology. 36 (1): 19–31. doi:10.1080/10408410500496763. PMID 16610335. S2CID 7420734. with Annex:Biosketches of scientist and other public figures in Russia's anti-plague system
