= 1629–1631 Italian plague =

Series of bubonic plague outbreaks in Italy

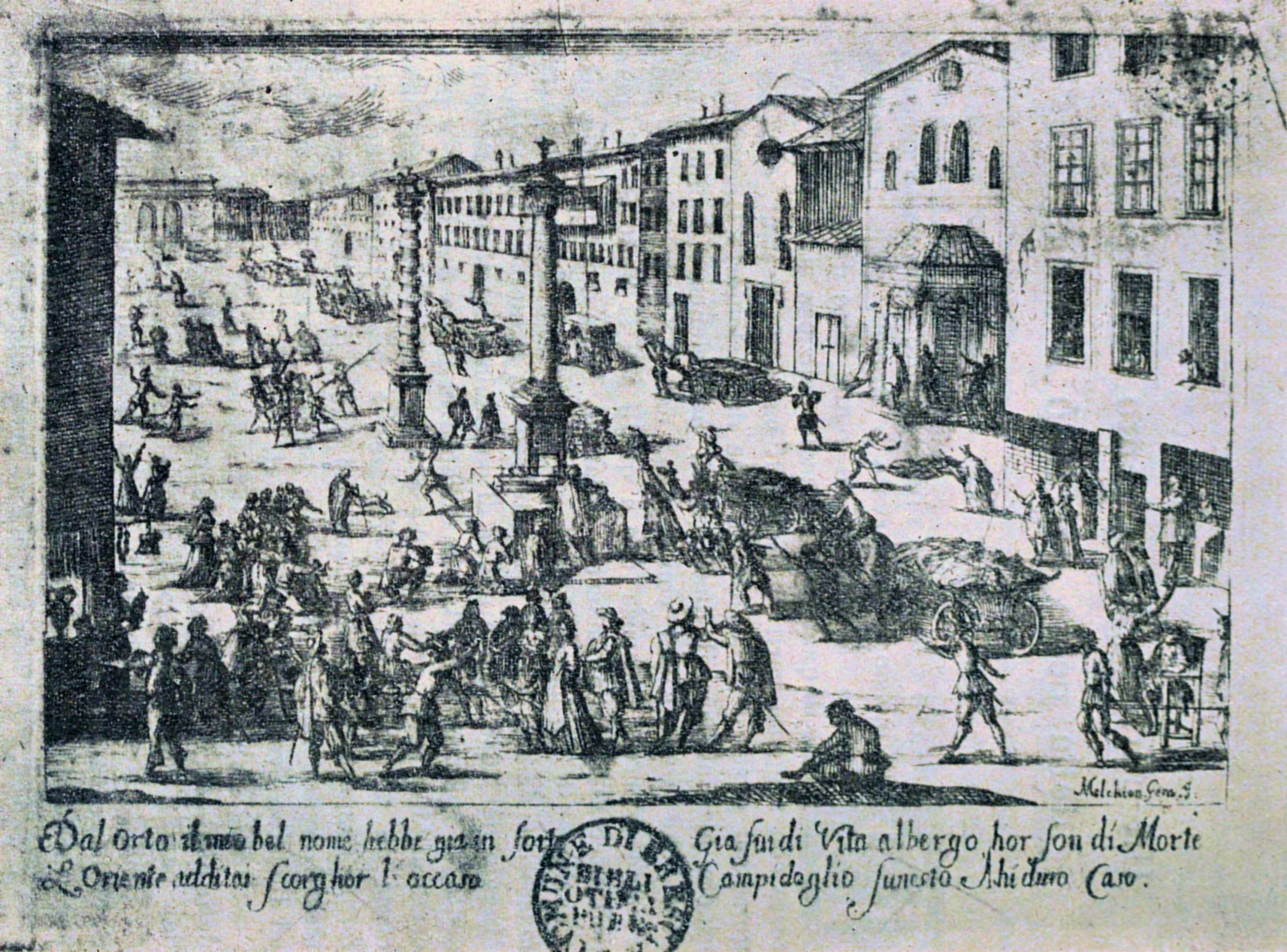
Melchiorre Gherardini, Piazza S. Babila, Milan, during the plague of 1630: plague carts carry the dead for burial.

The Italian plague of 1629–1631, also referred to as the Great Plague of Milan, was part of the second plague pandemic that began with the Black Death in 1348 and ended in the 18th century. One of two major outbreaks in Italy during the 17th century, it affected northern and central Italy and resulted in at least 280,000 deaths, with some estimating fatalities as high as one million, or about 35% of the population. The plague may have contributed to the decline of Italy's economy relative to those of other Western European countries.

== Outbreaks ==
Thought to have originated in Northern France in 1623, the plague was carried throughout Europe as a result of troop movements associated with the Thirty Years' War and was allegedly brought to Lombardy in 1629 by soldiers involved in the War of the Mantuan Succession. The disease first spread to Venetian troops and in October 1629 reached Milan, Lombardy's major commercial centre. Although the city instituted a quarantine and limited access to external visitors and trade goods, it failed to eliminate the disease. A major outbreak in March 1630 resulted from relaxed health measures during the carnival season, followed by a second wave in the spring and summer of 1631. Overall, Milan suffered approximately 60,000 fatalities out of a total population of 130,000.

East of Lombardy, the Republic of Venice was infected in 1630–31. The city of Venice was severely hit, with recorded casualties of 46,000 out of a population of 140,000. Some historians believe that the drastic loss of life, and its impact on commerce, ultimately resulted in the downfall of Venice as a major commercial and political power.

Population before the plague and death toll, selected cities:

City	Population in 1630	Death estimates by 1631	Percentage of population lost
Verona	54,000	33,000	61%
Parma	30,000	15,000	50%
Milan	130,000	60,000	46%
Venice	140,000	46,000	33%
Bologna	62,000	15,000	24%
Florence	76,000	9,000	12%

A 2019 study argues the plague of 1629–1631 led to lower growth in several cities affected by the plague and "caused long-lasting damage to the size of Italian urban populations and to urbanization rates. These findings support the hypothesis that seventeenth-century plagues played a fundamental role in triggering the process of relative decline of the Italian economies."

== See also ==
- Ludovico Settala
- Naples Plague (1656)
- List of epidemics
- Second plague pandemic
- Santa Maria della Salute, a church in Venice built as a votive offering for the city's deliverance from the plague
- Lazzaretto Vecchio, small island in the Venetian lagoon used as a cemetery for plague victims
- The Betrothed by Alessandro Manzoni

== Sources ==
- Alfani, Guido; Percoco, Marco (2019). "Plague and long-term development: the lasting effects of the 1629–30 epidemic on the Italian cities" (PDF). The Economic History Review. 72 (4): 1175–1201. doi:10.1111/ehr.12652. ISSN 1468-0289. S2CID 131730725. Archived from the original (PDF) on 2020-06-05.
- Cipolla, Carlo M. (1981). Fighting the Plague in Seventeenth Century Italy. Madison: University of Wisconsin Press. ISBN 0-299-08340-3.
- Hays, J. N. (2005). Epidemics and pandemics; their impacts on human history. ABC-CLIO. ISBN 978-1851096589.
- Kohn, George C. (2007). Encyclopedia of Plague and Pestilence: From Ancient Times to the Present (3rd ed.). New York: Facts on File. pp. 200. ISBN 9780816069354.
- Prinzing, Friedrich (1916). Epidemics Resulting from Wars. Oxford: Clarendon Press.
