= Maurice Berthe =

French medievalist (1935–2015)

- Born: 29 March 1935; Prades, France
- Died: 21 November 2015 (aged 80); Toulouse, France
- Occupation: Medievalist

Academic work
- Main interests: Late medieval economic and social history

Maurice Berthe (29 March 1935 in Prades – 21 November 2015 in Toulouse) was a French medievalist.

== Background ==
Berthe studied under Philippe Wolff at the University of Toulouse, where he then taught from 1967 to 1998. There he founded and was the first director of the UMR Framespa.

Like Wolff, he was interested in the economic and social history of the end of the Middle Ages, but unlike Wolff, primarily in rural history rather than urban. His work focused on demography, economy, land use and settlement in the South of France and northern Spain. He is the author of Le comté de Bigorre, un milieu rural au bas Moyen Âge, which was his doctoral thesis, and Famines et épidémies dans les campagnes navarraises à la fin du Moyen Âge.
