= 1770–1772 Russian plague =

Disease outbreak in Russia

The Russian plague epidemic of 1770–1772, also known as the Plague of 1771, was the last large-scale outbreak of plague in central Russia, claiming between 52,000 and 100,000 lives in Moscow alone (1/6 to 1/3 of its population). The bubonic plague epidemic that originated in the Moldavian theatre of the 1768–1774 Russian-Turkish war in January 1770 swept northward through Ukraine and central Russia, peaking in Moscow in September 1771 and causing the Plague Riot. The epidemic reshaped the map of Moscow, as new cemeteries were established beyond the 18th-century city limits.

== Outbreak ==
Russian troops in Focșani, Moldavia discovered the first signs of plague in January 1770; the disease, indigenous to the area, was contracted through prisoners of war and booty. The news was hailed and exaggerated by adversaries of Russia, and Catherine wrote a reassuring letter to Voltaire, arguing that "in spring those killed by plague will resurrect for the fighting". Commanding general Christopher von Stoffeln coerced army doctors to conceal the outbreak, which was not made public until Gustav Orreus, a Russian-Finnish surgeon reporting directly to Field Marshal Pyotr Rumyantsev, examined the situation, identified it as plague and enforced quarantine in the troops. Stoffeln, however, refused to evacuate the infested towns and himself fell victim to the plague in May 1770. Of 1,500 patients recorded in his troops in May–August 1770, only 300 survived.

Medical quarantine checkpoints instituted by Peter I and expanded by Catherine II were sufficient to prevent plague from reaching inside the country in peacetime, but they proved to be inadequate in time of war. The system regarded all epidemics as external threats, focusing on border control, and paid less attention to domestic measures. The epidemic blocked the logistics of Rumyantsev's army, and as the state tried to push more reserves and supplies to the theatre, peacetime quarantine controls had to be lifted. Plague swept into Poland and Ukraine; by August 1770 it reached Bryansk. Catherine refused to admit the plague in public, although she was clearly aware of the nature and proportions of the threat, as evidenced by her letters to Governor of Moscow Pyotr Saltykov.

== Moscow plague ==
When Peter the Great died in 1725, he left behind him the blooming, new capital of St. Petersburg, and the city of Moscow, now unstable because he had transferred the seat of power from that city to St. Petersburg. The now-abandoned Moscow and its suburbs attracted vast numbers of serfs and army deserters, who prompted the government to instigate change by "tightening serfdom and strengthening—or even just creating—administrative and estate institutions, and knitting all three into a seamless web of social control." The increasing population created more waste that needed to be dealt with, and no real solution for getting rid of it. There was human waste, horse waste, and waste from tanneries, slaughterhouses and other slatternly industries, all of which was piling up on each other.

Catherine II inherited the throne in 1762 and recognized the social concerns her empire was facing, such as the drastic increase in pollution and decrease in living standards. In 1767, her government decreed that the polluting factories, slaughterhouses, fish markets, and cemeteries be removed from the city, that it was illegal to pollute the waterways, and that dumps be established. Her goal in this was to westernize Moscow as well as St. Petersburg. She contended that by eliminating the foul smells associated with the city, the health of the inhabitants would improve; during the 18th century, the miasma theory (that disease came from bad smells) was prevalent. By moving the factories out of the city proper, Catherine also ensured a dispersal of the peasants and serfs, whom the city considered to be the source of the putrefaction, and therefore bring the source of the disease outside the city as well. As her memoires indicate, Catherine herself saw the stench and filth of the city as evidence of its being rooted in the past, before Russia became westernized. She hated Moscow, and before the plague outbreak, Moscow had no formal boundaries, there was no population count, and no real city planning. This lack of planning was also evidenced by the fact that the city was mostly still built from wood, despite the government urging change to stone structures in this department. While there were some stone buildings, they tended to be located in the center of the city, and the use of stone showed no real sign of spreading. There were fires, there was a high crime rate, the filth was unimaginable; the state of the city was a set up for disaster. Catherine attempted to fix these problems through pardons, case reviews, creating jobs for the unemployed and homeless, and strengthening the local government.

Despite her efforts to change the city, Catherine found herself facing an outbreak of the bubonic plague in the Russian Empire in 1770. The plague was somewhat of a constant threat in early modern Europe; no one could be sure where or when it would strike. In 1765, rumors circulated that the plague had traveled north from the Ottoman Empire into Poland. The same rumors echoed over the course of the next year, with the plague also supposedly appearing in Constantinople and the Crimea. There was a false alarm of the plague entering Russian territory, and another false alarm of supposed plague around Moscow that turned out to be smallpox. There were efforts made to keep plague out of Russia by creating quarantine stations on the southern border, but these proved to be ineffective.

In December 1770, a Doctor A. F. Shafonskiy, the chief physician at the Moscow General Hospital, identified a case of the bubonic plague and promptly reported it to German doctor A. Rinder, who was in charge of the public health of the city. Unfortunately, Rinder did not trust the former's judgment, and ignored the report. The next day, the Medical Council met and established the fact that the plague had entered the city, and informed the Senate in St. Petersburg. The response of the national government was to send military guards to the hospital in order to quarantine the cases. However, Shafonskiy and Rinder continued to stand on opposing sides, until Rinder denied Shafonskiy's claim in January 1771. Shafonskiy submitted a report in February

== Riot ==
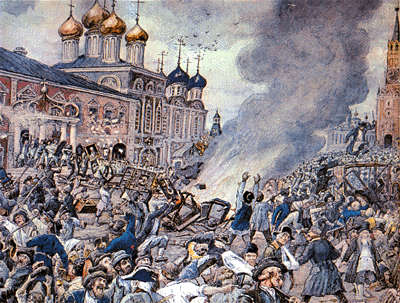
Plague riot in Moscow in 1771

The plague peaked in September 1771, killing an estimated thousand Muscovites a day (20,401 confirmed dead in September), despite the fact that an estimated three quarters of the population fled the city.

Governor Saltykov, failing to control the situation, preferred to desert his station and fled to his country estate; the police chief followed suit. Jacon Lerche, the newly appointed sanitary inspector of Moscow, declared state of emergency, shutting down shops, inns, taverns, factories and even churches; the city was placed under quarantine. Masses of people, literally thrown into the streets, were denied their regular trade and recreation habits.

== Emergency measures post infection out-break ==
When the riot was still unwinding, empress Catherine dispatched Grigory Orlov to take control of Moscow; it is not clear whether her choice was an assignment in good faith or an attempt to get rid of a former lover and a leader of an influential political clan. Orlov, accompanied by Gustav Orreus and four regiments of troops, arrived in Moscow on September 26, immediately calling an emergency council with local doctors. They confirmed presence of both bubonic and septicemic forms of plague. Orlov established and supervised an executive medical commission charged with developing the ways to check the epidemic. More important, he succeeded in changing public opinion in favor of the state's emergency measures, at the same improving the efficiency and quality of medical quarantine (in particular, varying quarantine duration for different groups of exposed but yet healthy people, and paying them for the quarantine stay).

The epidemic in Moscow, although still rampant in October, gradually reduced through the year. November 15 Catherine declared that it was officially over, but deaths continued into 1772. Estimates of total death toll in Moscow range from 52 to 100 thousand out of total 300 thousand.

Month	September	October	November	December	January 1772
Deaths (Moscow)	20,401	17,651	5,235	805	330

== Consequences ==
The plague stimulated local research in disease prevention, which was boosted by discovering indigenous plague in newly conquered territories of the Caucasus. The epidemic was professionally exposed to Western European academia through An account of plague which raged in Moscow 1771, published in 1798 in Latin by Belgian physician Charles de Mertens; an English translation was released in 1799.

=== Immediate political effect ===
Devastation caused by the plague forced the government to reduce taxes and military conscription quotas in the affected provinces; both measures decreased the military capabilities of the state and pushed Catherine to seek truce. The statesmen divided between supporters of further pressing into Moldavia and Wallachia and those who sided with Frederick II's proposal to quit the war and take Polish territories as compensation: nearby Polish lands were seen as cash source while Moldavia had to be put back under Ottoman suzerainty anyway. Catherine preferred to suit both parties and engaged in the Partitions of Poland while the war in the South protracted until 1774.

== See also ==
- List of epidemics
- Second plague pandemic
