= Sergij Vilfan =

Sergij Vilfan in 1953

Sergij Vilfan (5 April 1919 - 16 March 1996) (also incorrectly spelled as Sergej Vilfan), was a Slovenian jurist and historian, part of the so-called Ljubljana school of historiography, and member of the Slovenian Academy of Sciences and Arts.

He was born as Sergij Wilfan in a wealthy Slovene family in Trieste, Italy. His uncle, Josip Vilfan, was a politician, lawyer and human rights activist. His cousin Joža Vilfan became an influential Communist official and Yugoslav diplomat, while his other cousin Draško Vilfan was a renowned physician. Sergij's father was a naval engineer and Yugoslav diplomat who moved around Europe because of his work, while his mother Ide Jeanrenaud was of an Italian-speaking Triestine of mixed Swiss, Huguenot and Sudeten German descent. Sergij grew up in a multilingual environment. Besides Slovene and French, he also learned Italian, German and Serbo-Croatian since a young age. He lived with his family in Bratislava, Vienna and Dubrovnik. In 1931, after the death of his father, the family settled in Ljubljana. Sergij studied law at the University of Ljubljana. After graduation in 1941, he served as lawyer. In June 1942, he was arrested by the Italian Fascist authorities of the Province of Ljubljana and interned in the concentration camp in Gonars.

After World War II, he covered several posts in the state administration before becoming the head of the City Historical Archives of Ljubljana. In 1961 he spent 6 months in Paris studying economic history with Jean Meuvret at the École pratique des hautes études. In 1971, he became a professor of legal history at the Faculty of Law of the University of Ljubljana. Vilfan eventually became one of the most renowned experts for the legal and economic history of the Slovene Lands. He also wrote about early medieval settlement patterns.

Sergij Vilfan was a member of Académie européenne d'histoire in Brussels (from 1981), a member of Société Jean Bodin (from 1974), a member and president of The International Commission for the History of Towns (ICHT) and collaborated with the International Commission for the History of Representative and Parliamentary Institutions (ICHRPI). For his work, he received several prizes at home and abroad, among them, in 1980, Anton-Gindely Preis from the Institut für den Donauraum und Mitteleuropa in Vienna (Austria).

He died in Ljubljana in 1996.

== Major works ==
- Pravna zgodovina Slovencev ("Legal History of Slovenes". Ljubljana: Slovenska matica, 1961).
- Rechtsgeschichte der Slowenen bis zum Jahre 1941. Graz: Leykam Verlag, 1968.
- Die deutsche Kolonisation nordöstlich der oberen Adria und ihre sozialgeschichten Grundlagen ("The German Colonisation of the North-Eastern Part of the Upper Adriatic and its Social-historical Basis". Sigmaringen: Jan Thorbecke, 1974).
- Wirtschaftsgeschichte und Rechtsgeschichte ("Economic History and Legal History. Graz: University of Graz, 1985).
- Les communautés rurales entre l'occident et les Balkans : formes Slovenes jusqu'au début du XXe siecle ("Rural Communities between the West and the Balkans: Slovene Formes until Early 20th Century". Paris: Dessain et Tolra, 1986).
- L'individu face au pouvoir à la fin du moyen age : essai de comparaison entre l'Empire serbe et les provinces alpines du Sud-Est ("The Individual and Power in Late Middle Ages: A Comparative Essay between the Serbian Empire and the Southeastern Alpine Areas". Brussels: Editions de la libraire encyclopédique, 1989).
- Crown, Estates and the Financing of Defence in Inner Austria, 1500-1630 (London: Macmillan & School of Slavonic and East European Studies University of London, 1991)
- Towns and States at the Juncture of the Alps, the Adriatic, and Pannonia (Boulder, San Francisco, Oxford: Westview Press, 1994).
