= Herman Diederiks =

Dutch historian

- Born: 1937
- Died: 1995 (aged 57–58)
- Citizenship: Dutch
- Writing career
- Genre: Crime & Justice History

Herman Diederiks (9 October 1937 in Rotterdam – 11 August 1995 in Ardèche) was a Dutch historian who specialized in crime and justice history in the Netherlands. In 1978, he was one of the founders of the International Association for the History of Crime and Criminal Justice (IAHCCJ).

== Life ==
Diederiks joined the department of economic and social history of the University of Leiden around 1970, at a time when it was common in Dutch academia to hire people for teaching who would complete their PhD later. He soon became secretary of the history section of the national Academic Council. In 1973, he and Sjoerd Faber founded the Dutch Group for the Study of Penal History – an informal and diverse group of scholars and PhD students who regularly met in order to discuss each other's work. In 1977, the Dutch Group organized the first international conference on the history of crime and justice, held in Amsterdam and Leiden. The next year, under the aegis of the Maison des Sciences de l'Homme, Paris, Herman, together with Maurice Aymard and Pieter Spierenburg, founded the International Association for the History of Crime and Criminal Justice.

In 1982 Diederiks defended his dissertation at the University of Amsterdam. It was published as Een stad in verval: Amsterdam omstreeks 1800, demografisch, economisch, ruimtelĳk (A city in decline: Amsterdam around 1800, demographic and economic space). This quantitative urban study was characteristic of his scholarly approach: he chose to focus not on Amsterdam's greatness, but on a period of decline, believing that such a focus could yield useful insights. He contributed to collective volumes and journals, publishing articles on aspects of crime and justice history in both Dutch and English. In 1992 he published In een land van justitie: Criminaliteit van vrouwen, soldaten en ambtenaren in de 18e-eeuwse Republiek (In a land of justice: Criminality of women, soldiers and civil servants in the eighteenth-century Dutch Republic).

His major efforts continued to be directed at establishing scholarly contacts all over the world. Already by the early 1980s he got the nickname "The Flying Dutchman". Throughout the 1980s and the first half of the 1990s he was the force behind several international conferences in crime and justice history, as well as annual colloquia in the Maison des Sciences de l'Homme.

During a bicycle ride in the Ardèche in August 1995, Diederiks fell from a bridge. Although the incident did not seem serious, it developed that he had a weak spot in his aorta, which led to his death.

== The IAHCCJ ==
The International Association for the History of Crime and Criminal Justice was established in 1978. The founders intended that it should encourage the study of the history of crime and criminal justice in the widest sense. In particular they hoped that the Association would organise, and assist in the organisation of, colloquia and conferences which address issues of interest to the members, and which provide opportunities for the exchange of ideas between established scholars and those just beginning an academic career; publish, and facilitate the publication of, work on the subject of the history of crime and criminal justice.

From its inception, and with the assistance of the Maison des Sciences de l'Homme, the Association published a Bulletin for its members. In 1997 the Bulletin was replaced by the bi-annual, bi-lingual (English/French) journal, Crime, Histoire & Sociétés/Crime, History & Societies.

== Herman Diederiks prize ==
Each year, as an encouragement to young scholars of the subject, the Association and the journal offer the Herman Diederiks Prize for the best article submitted to the journal by a new researcher in the area. The prizewinning essay is published in the journal, and the winner is offered the opportunity of one month's research in Paris courtesy of the Maison des Sciences de l'Homme.
