= International Commission for the History of Towns =

The International Commission for the History of Towns (French Commission Internationale pour l'Histoire des Villes - CIHV; German Internationale Kommission für Städtegeschichte - IKSG) is a forum for comparative urban history research and an international network of urban history researchers.

== History ==
The commission was established at the Tenth International Congress of the Historical Sciences in Rome (4–11 September 1955) at the initiative of Hector Amann (1894–1967) and Edith Ennen (1907–1999), following a decision by the International Committee of Historical Sciences. The aim was to create a forum for comparative urban history research and develop an international network of urban history researchers. Annual general meetings were held for the first time in Dijon in 1956, and agreed on a program which focused on three projects: the "Elenchus fontium historiae urbanae", providing sources for high medieval urban development, urban history bibliographies and historic towns atlases. From the beginning, the main languages of the commission were German, French, and English.

The first two projects were discontinued after a series of relevant publications in response to newer internet-based research possibilities, but the historic towns atlases have developed into a groundbreaking project. As of 2019, there were 19 national historic towns atlas series. Guidelines to ensure comparability were adopted in 1968, and upgraded several times. In 1969 the British Atlas of Historic Towns started publication, followed by atlases for other European countries. With the fall of communism in 1989/90, countries in East Central Europe and Eastern Europe also joined the project. The national historic towns atlases together constitute the "European Historic Towns Atlas" project, as listed on the website of the Institute for Comparative Urban History in Munster and of the Royal Irish Academy in Dublin and up to 2014 in Appendix A of the book Lords and Towns, published by Ashgate in 2015. The Commission's Atlas Working Group has been in existence since 1993.

According to the current statutes, the commission is formed by a maximum of 70 European and 10 intercontinental full members (with the right to vote), as well as honorary members; the number of members to be appointed by individual European countries is fixed. The commission elects a board that looks after upcoming business (such as conferences, publications, and membership). The General Assembly, upon the proposal of members, decides on a common research focus for the period between the International Congresses of the Historical Sciences. For the period 2016-2019 the topic was "Essential Functionalities of Urban Spaces in Transition". Recent General Assemblies focused on the following topics: Kiel (2016): Social functions of urban spaces in transformation, Cologne, Weimar and Vienna; Cracow (2017): Political functions of urban spaces in transformation; Salzburg (2018): Cultural functions of urban spaces in transformation; Budapest (2019): Economic functions of urban spaces in transformation.

The commission has a website on which its annual reports (Newsletter of the International Commission for the History of Towns) can be found.

== Presidents ==
- Hermann Aubin, University of Hamburg [1885–1969] (1956–1958)
- Hector Ammann, Saarland University [1894–1967] (1959–1967)
- Philippe Wolff, University of Toulouse [1913–2001] (1968–1980)
- Sergij Vilfan, University of Ljubljana [1919–1996] (1981–1991)
- Adriaan Verhulst, Ghent University [1929–2002] (1992–2001)
- Thomas Riis, Kiel University (2002–2006)
- Michel Pauly, University of Luxembourg (2007–2016)
- Roman Czaja, Nicolaus Copernicus University in Toruń (2017–2025)
- Rosa Smurra, University of Bologna, (2026-)

== General assemblies ==
Kaunas 2026; Ljubljana 2025; Matera 2024; Iasi 2023; Maynooth, Dublin, Derry-Londonderry 2022; Split 2021; Budapest 2019; Salzburg 2018; Kraków 2017; Kiel 2016; Zürich 2015; Clermont-Ferrand 2014; Lisboa 2013; Prague 2012; Sibiu 2011; Amsterdam 2010; Helsinki 2010; Luxemburg 2009; Lecce 2008; London 2007; Zagreb 2006; Kiel 2005; Münster 2004; Vienna 2003; Torún 2002; Bologna 2001; Oslo 2000; Bordeaux 1999; Spa 1998; Saloniki 1997; Bern 1996; Montréal 1995; Sigtuna 1994; Trier 1993; Alphen an den Rijn 1992; Meißen 1991; Linz 1990; Madrid 1990; Helsingör 1989; Andorra 1988; Helsinki 1987; Bologna 1986; Stuttgart 1985; Dublin 1984; Linz 1983; Saloniki 1982; Leningrad 1981; Bucarest 1980; Bruxelles 1979; Münster/Westfalen 1978; Varna 1977; Aarhus 1976; San Francisco 1975; Ljubljana 1974; Ferrara 1973; Budapest 1972; Barcelona 1971; Moscow 1970; Salzburg 1969; Oxford 1968; Engelberg 1967; Warsaw 1966; Vienna 1965; Dordrecht 1964; Verona 1963; Esslingen 1962; Toulouse 1961; Brugge 1959; Fribourg 1958; Maastricht 1957; Dijon 1956

== Recent publications of papers delivered at the general assemblies ==
- Peter Johanek, Heinz Stoob (eds), Europäische Messen und Märktesysteme im Mittelalter und Neuzeit, (Städteforschung A/39, Cologne 1996)
- Destruction et reconstruction de villes, du Moyen Age à nos jours. Actes/Verwoesting en Wederopbouw van Steden, van de Middeleeuwen tot heden: Handelingen. 18e colloque international/18de internationaal colloquium: Spa, 10-12.IX.1996 (Collection Histoire, 100, Brussels 1999).
- Martin Körner (ed.), Stadtzerstörung und Wiederaufbau/Destruction and reconstruction of towns/Destruction et reconstruction des villes, 3 volumes (Bern 1999-2000).
- Francesca Bocchi, Rosa Smurra (eds.), Imago urbis. L’immagine della città nella storia d’Italia. Atti del convengno internazionale (Bologna 5-7 settembre 2001, Rome 2003).
- Ferdinand Opll (ed.), Bild und Wahrnehmung der Stadt (Beiträge zur Geschichte der Städte Mitteleuropas 19, Linz 2004).
- Roman Czaja (ed.), Das Bild und die Wahrnehmung der Stadt und der städtischen Gesellschaft im Hanseraum im Mittelalter und in der frühen Neuzeit (Toruń 2004).
- Franz Irsigler, Michel Pauly (ed.), Messen, Jahrmärkte und Stadtentwicklung in Europa/Foires, marchés annuels et développement urbain en Europe (Beiträge zur Landes- und Kulturgeschichte, 5/ Publications du CLUDEM 17, Trier 2007).
- Neven Budak, Finn-Einar Eliassen, Katalin Szende (eds.), Towns and Communication (Zagreb 2009).
- Ferdinand Opll, Christoph Sonnlechner (eds.), Europäische Städte im Mittelalter (Forschungen und Beiträge zur Wiener Stadtgeschichte 52, Vienna 2010).
- Hubert Houben, Kristjan Toomaspoeg (eds.), Towns and Communication, vol. 2: Communications between Towns (Galatina 2011).
- Michel Pauly, Martin Scheutz (eds.), Cities and their spaces. Concepts and their Use in Europe (Städteforschung A/88; Cologne 2014).
- Michel Pauly, Alexander Lee (eds.), Urban Liberties and Citizenship from the Middle Ages up to Now (Beiträge zur Landes- und Kulturgeschichte 9, Trier / Luxemburg 2015).
- Jean-Luc Fray, Michel Pauly, Magda Pinheiro, Martin Scheutz (eds.), Urban Spaces and the Complexity of Cities (Städteforschung A/97, Cologne 2018).
- Gerhard Fouquet, Ferdinand Opll, Sven Rabeler, Martin Scheutz (eds.), Social Functions of Urban Spaces through the Ages / Soziale Funktionen städtischer Räume im Wandel (Residenzenforschung Neue Folge : Stadt und Hof 5, Ostfildern 2018).
- Martina Stercken, Christian Hesse (eds.), Kommunale Selbstinszenierungen. Städtische Konstellationen zwischen Mittelalter und Neuzeit (Medienwandel, Medienwechsel, Medienwissen 40, Zürich 2018).
- Roman Czaja, Zdzisław Noga, Ferdinand Opll, Martin Scheutz (eds.), Political Functions of Urban Spaces and Town Types through the Ages. Making Use of the Historic Towns Atlases in Europe / Politische Funktionen städtischer Räume und Städtetypen im zeitlichen Wandel. Nutzung der historischen Städteatlanten in Europa (Cracow – Toruń – Vienna 2019).
- Irena Benyovsky Latin, Martina Stercken, Tonija Andrić (eds.), Protagonists of Urban Order from the Middle Ages to the Present (Amsterdam 2025).
- Francesco Panarelli, Rosa Smurra (eds.), Discourses on Urban Order (Matera 2025).
- Laurențiu Rădvan, Roman Czaja (eds.), Mediating Urban Order in Europe (Iași 2026).
