= Black Death in Spain =

1346-1353 spread of the Black Death in Europe map

The Black Death was present in Spain between 1348 and 1350. In the 14th century, present-day Spain was composed of the crowns of Aragon and Castile, the Kingdom of Navarre, and the Emirate of Granada. In the countries on the Iberian Peninsula, the Black Death is well-documented and researched in Navarre and particularly in Aragon (recorded in the chronicle of Peter IV), but less documented in Castile and Granada.

The demographic impact of the Black Death in the Iberian Peninsula remains the subject of scholarly debate. While mortality varied considerably between regions, recent scholarship has argued that Spain's overall demographic losses were moderate compared with the European average, rather than uniformly catastrophic across the peninsula. Across Europe, the Black Death is estimated to have killed between 30% and 60% of the population, reducing the continent's population from approximately 80 million to around 30 million between 1347 and 1353.

== Aragon ==
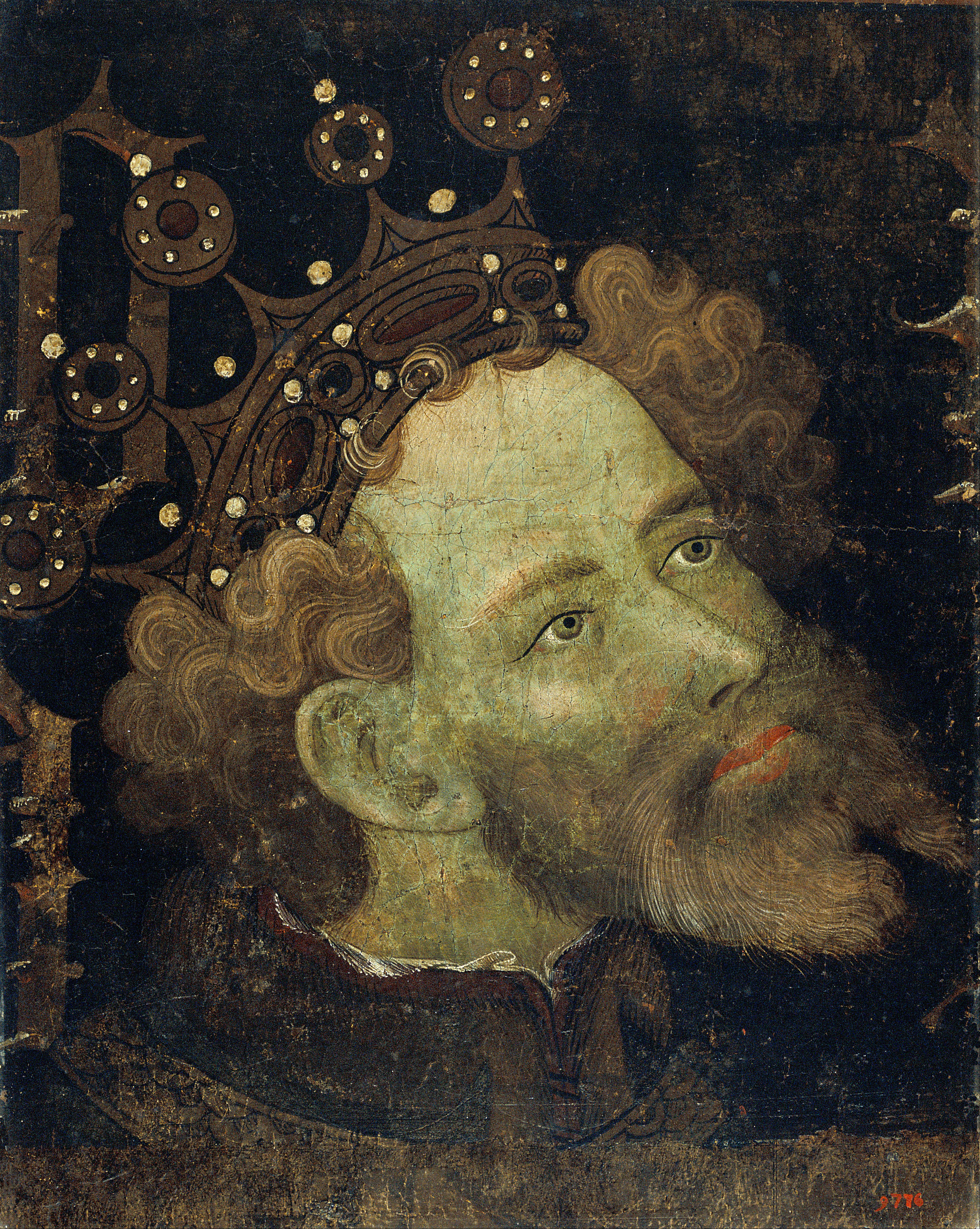
Jaume Mateu - Peter IV the Ceremonious, who wrote a chronicle about the Black Death in Aragon.

The Black Death in Aragon is described by contemporary witnesses, such as in the chronicle of Peter IV of Aragon, and has been subjected to thorough research which has demonstrated the effect that the plague could have on a society.

The Black Death reached Aragon in the spring of 1348, and lasted a year. It interrupted the civil war which took place at the time, when the King was able to convince the rebels by whom he was captive to release him as they would otherwise endanger his life because of the migration of the plague.

The collapse of the administration and social order lasted for several years and resulted a breakdown of law and order, widespread criminality, repression from the nobility and rebellions during the following century.

== Castile ==
The Black Death in Castile is not as well researched or documented as in Aragon and Navarre. In 1350, it caused the death of king Alfonso XI of Castile in the middle of his warfare against Muslim Andalusia.

== Navarre ==
The Black Death in Navarre has been subjected to the research of Maurice Berthe, among others. It had a severe effect on the country, as Navarre was already recovering from a severe famine when the Plague arrived. About 50% of the population are estimated to have died.

== Granada ==
The Black Death in Granada is described by the Granadan polymath and physician Ibn al-Khatib in his treatise, Muqni'at al-Sā'il 'an al-Maraḍ al-Hā'il, which is preserved at the Library of El Escorial.
