= Great Plague of Vienna =

1679 outbreak of plague in Vienna, Austria

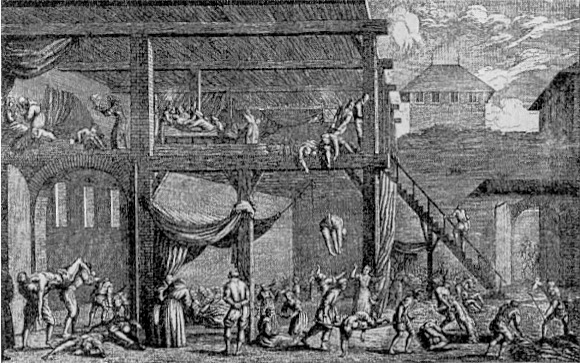
A plague hospital in Vienna 1679. Contemporary engraving.

The Great Plague of Vienna occurred in 1679 in Vienna, Austria, the imperial residence of the Austrian Habsburg rulers. From contemporary descriptions, the disease is believed to have been bubonic plague, which is caused by the bacterium Yersinia pestis, carried by fleas associated with the black rat and other rodents. The city was crippled by the epidemic, which recurred fitfully into the early 1680s, claiming an estimated 76,000 residents.

Vienna, located on the River Danube, was a major trading crossroads between east and west. As a result of this traffic, the city had suffered from episodic plague outbreaks since the first wave of "Black Death" in the fourteenth century. The city was crowded and densely built. Descriptions indicate that there were no public sewers or drainage systems, with stinking mounds of domestic garbage littering the streets. In addition, warehouses for trade goods, which held items such as clothing, carpets, and grain for months at a time, were heavily infested with rats. Conditions in the city were considered so unhealthy and filthy, even for the time, that the plague often carried the title "Viennese death" in other parts of Europe.

A religious order operating in Vienna, the Brotherhood of the Holy Trinity, created special hospitals for both children and adults during the 1679 epidemic. The basic nursing care offered in the hospitals was simple, but was generally a vast improvement over other medical and public health measures in the city. Doctors treated patients by using emetics, bloodletting, and by applying noxious ointments. The corpses of plague victims were carted to the outer edges of the city and placed in large open pits for burning. However, the pits were exposed to the open air for several days until they were nearly full, allowing ongoing infection of the rat population.

To commemorate the city's deliverance from the Great Plague and later waves of the disease, the Viennese erected monuments such as the famous Baroque Karlskirche with the associated 69 foot plague columns known as the Pestsäule.

== Regional outbreak ==
What has become known as the "Great Plague of Vienna", was actually only a subset of a much larger outbreak across Germany, Austria, Bohemia, and neighboring regions. This epidemic appears to have been carried into the region from two opposing directions. It had been raging in Western Europe for many years, traveling East by trade routes. The Great Plague of London of 1665–1666, which is believed to have originated from the Netherlands in the 1650s, killed around 100,000 people, and was the first major epidemic in a series of outbreaks. In 1666 a severe plague raged in Cologne and on the Rhine, which was prolonged until 1670 in the district. In the Netherlands, there was a plague in 1667–1669, but there are no definite notices of it after 1672. France saw its last plague epidemic in 1668.

In the years 1675–1684 a new plague wave originated in the Ottoman Empire (Turkey and areas of the Balkans). It moved into North Africa, Bohemia, Poland, Hungary, Austria and Saxony, progressing generally northward. The island of Malta lost 11,000 people in an epidemic in 1675–76.

The plague of Vienna in 1679 was very severe, causing at least 76,000 deaths. Other urban centers in this area of Europe had similar levels of casualties. For instance, Prague in 1681 lost 83,000 due to plague. Dresden was affected in 1680, Magdeburg and Halle in 1682. In Halle, a mortality of 4,397 out of a population of about 10,000 was recorded. Many North German city populations fell in these years. By 1683, the plague disappeared from Germany until the epidemic of 1707.

== Lieber Augustin ==
The great plague of 1679 gave rise to the legend of Lieber Augustin ("Dear Augustin"). Augustin was a popular street musician, who, according to the legend, fell into a pit with bodies of plague victims, late at night when he was drunk. Augustin did not contract the disease, which may have been owed to the influence of the alcohol.

Augustin is remembered in the popular folk song Oh du lieber Augustin.

== See also ==
- History of Vienna
- Pestsäule (Vienna)
