= Philippe Wolff =

French medievalist

Philippe Wolff (1913–2001) was a French medievalist who specialised in the economic and social history of Languedoc.

== Life and career ==
Wolff was born in Montmorency, Seine-et-Oise, on 2 September 1913. He graduated licentiate of history and geography in 1934, and doctor of letters in 1939. At the beginning of the Second World War he was a liaison officer with the British Expeditionary Force in France. From 1945 to 1974 he taught, from 1953 as a full professor, at the Université de Toulouse II. From 1968 to 1980 he served as president of the International Commission for the History of Towns. On 9 February 1973 he became a member of the Académie des Inscriptions et Belles-Lettres. He was also a member of the Royal Historical Society, the Institute for Catalan Studies, the Medieval Academy of America and the Reial Acadèmia de Bones Lletres de Barcelona. He died in Andorra on 3 September 2001.

== Awards and honours ==
- Chevalier de la Légion d’honneur
- Officier de l’Ordre des Palmes académiques
- Commandeur de l’Ordre des Arts et Lettres

== Publications ==
=== Books ===
- 1954: Commerces et marchands de Toulouse, vers 1350-1450
- 1960: with F. Mauro, Histoire du travail. II, L’âge de l’artisanat, Ve-XVIIIe siècles
- 1962: with J. Dieuzaide, Voix et images de Toulouse
- 1965: with P. Gérard and E. Magnou, Les cartulaires des Templiers de Douzens
- 1968: The Awakening of Europe (Pelican History of European Thought, 1)
- 1969: with G. Wiet and V. Elisseeff, Histoire du développement scientifique et culturel de l’Humanité. III, De 400 à 1300 après J.-C.
- 1971: Les origines linguistiques de l’Europe occidentale
- 1978: Regards sur le Midi médiéval
- 1980: (editor), Histoire du diocèse de Toulouse
- 1985: (editor), Histoire de Perpignan
- 1986: Automne du Moyen Âge ou Printemps des temps nouveaux? L'économie européenne aux XIVe et XVe siècles
- 1993: Histoire internationale du vouvoiement

=== Articles ===
- "The 1391 Pogrom in Spain. Social Crisis or Not?", Past & Present, 50 (1971), pp. 4-18. https://www.jstor.org/stable/650241
