= Kiff =

Kiff or KIFF may refer to:

== Names ==
=== Surname ===
- Kaleena Kiff (born 1974), American actress, producer, and director
- Ken Kiff (1935–1961), English figurative painter

=== Given name ===
- Kiff Gallagher, American musician, songwriter, and nonprofit administrator
- Kiff Scholl, American character actor and television/film director
- Kiff Slemmons (born 1944), American metalsmith and performance artist
- Kiff VandenHeuvel, American actor, teacher, director, and podcast host

=== Fictional characters ===
- Kif Croker, from the animated television series Futurama
- Kiff Chatterley, the main character of Kiff

== Entertainment ==
- Kiff (TV series), an American-South African TV series
- Kiff, an album by South African musician The Kiffness (David Scott) with Matthew Gold

== Film festivals ==
- Karatsu International Film Festival, Karatsu, Saga, Japan
- Kolkata International Film Festival, Kolkata, West Bengal, India

== See also ==
- Hannington-Kiff sign, a clinical sign
