= A Journal of the Plague Year =

1722 novel by Daniel Defoe

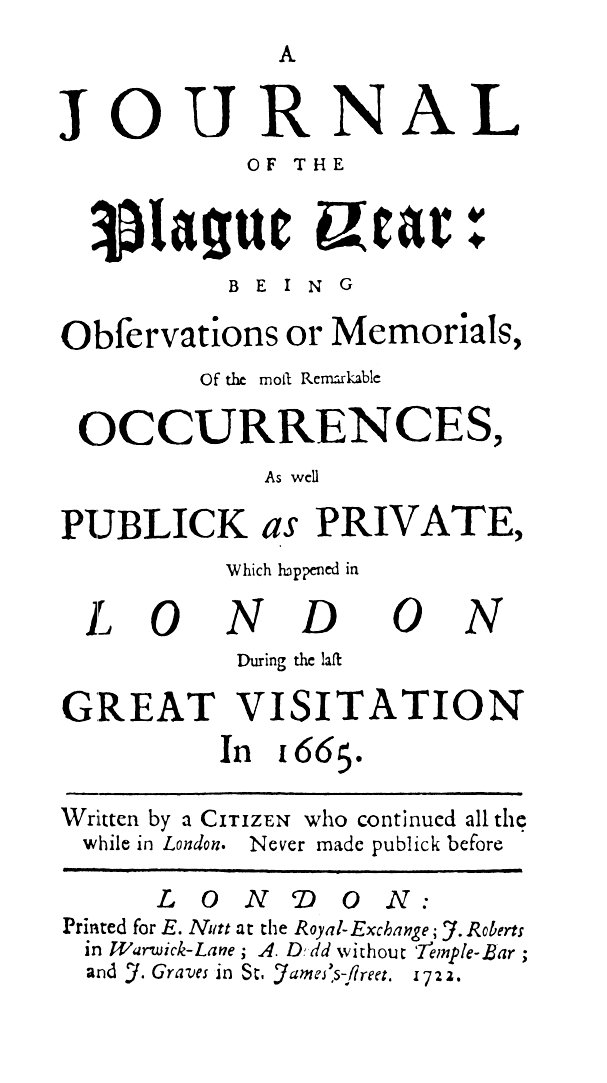
- Title page of the original edition in 1722
- Author: Daniel Defoe
- Language: English
- Genre: Historical novel
- Set in: London, 1665
- Publisher: E. Nutt; J. Roberts; A. Dodd; J. Graves
- Publication date: 1722
- Publication place: Great Britain
- Media type: Print
- Pages: 287
- Dewey Decimal: 823.5
- LC Class: PR3404 .J6
- Text: A Journal of the Plague Year at Wikisource

A Journal of the Plague Year: Being Observations or Memorials, Of the most Remarkable Occurrences, As well Publick as Private, which happened in London During the last Great Visitation In 1665 is a novel by Daniel Defoe, first published in March 1722. It is an account of one man's experiences of the year 1665, in which the bubonic plague struck the city of London in what became known as the Great Plague of London, the last epidemic of plague in that city, as part of the larger, centuries-long second plague pandemic. The book is told somewhat chronologically, though without sections or chapter headings, and with frequent digressions and repetitions.

Presented as an eyewitness account of the events at the time, it was written in the years just prior to the book's first publication in March 1722. Defoe was only five years old in 1665 when the Great Plague took place, and the book itself was published under the initials H. F. and is probably based on the journals of Defoe's uncle, Henry Foe, who, like 'H. F.', was a saddler who lived in the Whitechapel district of East London.

In the book, Defoe goes to great pains to achieve an effect of verisimilitude, identifying specific neighbourhoods, streets, and even houses in which events took place. Additionally, it provides tables of casualty figures and discusses the credibility of various accounts and anecdotes received by the narrator.

The book is often compared to the actual, contemporary accounts of the plague in the diary of Samuel Pepys. Defoe's account, which appears to include much research, is far more systematic and detailed than Pepys's first-person account.

Portrait of the author, Daniel Defoe

== Classification ==
How the Journal is to be classified has been disputed. It was initially presented and read as a work of nonfiction, but by the 1780s the work's fictional status was accepted. Debate continued as to whether Defoe could be regarded as the work's author rather than merely its editor. Edward Wedlake Brayley wrote in 1835 that the Journal is "emphatically, not a fiction, not based on fiction ... great injustice is done to [Defoe's] memory so to represent it." Brayley takes pains to compare Defoe's account with known bona fide accounts such as Loimologia by Dr. Nathaniel Hodges (1672), the diary of Samuel Pepys, and Thomas Vincent's God's Terrible Voice in the City by Plague and Fire (1667), as well as primary sources. This view was also held by Watson Nicholson – writing in 1919 – who argued that "there is not one single statement in the Journal, pertinent to the history of the Great Plague in London, that has not been verified during the course of this investigation", and "we are compelled to class the Journal of the Plague Year with authentic histories." It is, according to Nicholson, "a faithful record of historical facts ... [and] was so intended by the author." At least one modern literary critic, Frank Bastian, has agreed that "the invented detail is ... small and inessential" and that the Journal "stands closer to our idea of history than to that of fiction", and that "any doubts that remain whether to label it "fiction" or "history" arise from the ambiguities inherent in those words."

Other literary critics have argued that the work should be regarded as a work of imaginative fiction, and thus can justifiably be described as an "historical novel". This view was held by Everett Zimmerman, who wrote that "It is the intensity of the focus on the narrator that makes A Journal of the Plague Year more like a novel than like ... history." Indeed, Defoe's use of the narrator "H.F.", and his initial presentation of the Journal as being the recollections of an eye-witness to the plague, is the major sticking point for critics who consider it more of a "romance" – "one of the peculiar class of compositions which hovers between romance and history" as it was described by Sir Walter Scott – than a historical account. Walter George Bell, a historian of the plague, noted that Defoe should not be considered to be a historian because he uses his sources uncritically.

Scott's somewhat ambiguous view of the nature of the Journal was shared by Defoe's first major biographer, Walter Wilson, who wrote in Memoir of the Life and Times of Daniel De Foe (1830) about it that "[Defoe] has contrived to mix up so much that is authentic with the fabrications of his own brain, that it is impossible to distinguish one from the other; and he has given the whole such a likeness to the dreadful original, as to confound the sceptic, and encircle him in his enchantments." In Wilson's view the work is an "alliance between history and fiction" in which one continually morphs into the other and back again. This view is shared by John Richetti who calls the Journal a type of "pseudohistory", a "thickly factual, even grossly truthful book" in which "the imagination ... flares up occasionally and dominates those facts."

These alternative conceptualisations of the Journal – as fiction, history, or history-cum-fiction – continue to exist.

== Adaptations ==
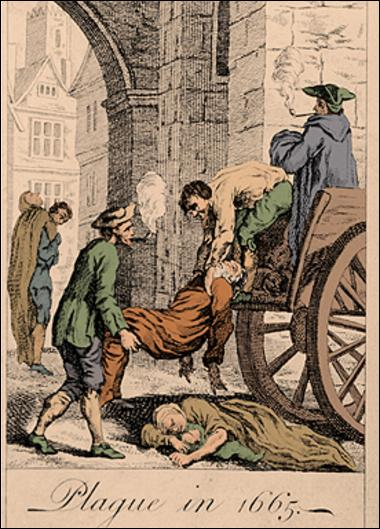
Illustration of corpse collection during the 1665 plague

- In 1945, the syndicated radio programme The Weird Circle adapted the novel into a condensed 30-minute drama.
- The 1979 Mexican film El Año de la Peste (The Year of the Plague), directed by Mexican director Felipe Cazals from a screenplay written by Gabriel García Márquez, was based on A Journal of the Plague Year.
- The Oscar-nominated 1999 German stop motion animated short film Periwig Maker is based on A Journal of the Plague Year.
- A 2016 BBC Radio 4 play adapted the novel into a 60-minute drama.

A Journal of the Plague Year also served as the initial inspiration for Anthony Clarvoe's play The Living.

== In popular culture ==
A supernatural copy of the work appears in The Magnus Archives, wherein it is able to cause buildings to become infected; one character describes his childhood home being destroyed by the book "in a collapse of diseased brick and septic foundations."

References to the book's title have been made in Michael D. O'Brien's 1999 novel Plague Journal, where the narrator and main character choose the title to describe the theme of the book (jokingly referring to himself as a modern-day Defoe) and Norman Spinrad's 1995 Journals of the Plague Years, a satirical novel about a sexually transmitted viral disease that cannot be defeated by vaccines, referencing how AIDS was in its earliest days known as "the gay plague".

A comparison of plague-driven behaviour described by Defoe and the COVID-19 crisis of 2020 is discussed in "Persistent Patterns of Behavior: Two Infectious Disease Outbreaks 350 Years Apart", an article in the journal Economic Inquiry, and also in a commentary in The Guardian.

The 1975 play A Journal of the Plague Year by Shūji Terayama in collaboration with Rio Kishida is inspired by the work, and deals with the effects of a plague in a town in Southeast Asia.
