= Periwig Maker =

- Directed by: Steffen Schäffler
- Written by: Annette Schäffler
- Based on: A Journal of the Plague Year (1722 novel) by Daniel Defoe
- Produced by: Annette Schäffler
- Narrated by: Kenneth Branagh
- Music by: Chris Heyne
- Distributed by: Ideal Standard Film
- Release date: November 13, 1999
- Running time: 14:43
- Countries: Germany; United Kingdom

Periwig Maker is a 1999 British-German short stop motion animation film. 15 minutes long, it is based on Daniel Defoe's novel A Journal of the Plague Year (1722). The film was produced by Ideal Standard film, directed by Steffen Schäffler and narrated by Kenneth Branagh.

== Plot ==
The film is set in London in 1665, during the Great Plague of London. The protagonist is a wig maker who locks himself in his shop, isolating himself from society so that he will not contract the plague. He watches from inside his shop as the plague ravages the city, taking the lives of the majority of the citizens. He makes observations in his journal, hypothesising that the plague is transmitted through effluvia (breath, sweat and the smell of sores).

The camera pans through the dark, dilapidated city filled with death. The wig maker focuses on a newly orphaned girl with striking red hair who lives across the street. He watches her mother's corpse get tossed to the body collectors and the girl succumb to the plague herself. The night before she dies, the girl's spirit visits the periwig maker and informs him of her imminent death. After her death, he goes to the mass grave and retrieves her red hair to make a wig from it. In the final scene, the wig maker lies in bed, wearing the red wig, describing the reconstruction of London after the dissipation of the plague.

== Gothic influence ==
The short film utilizes several characteristics of the Gothic style. It includes the physical terror that the periwig maker experiences as he shuts himself in his house in order to prevent contracting the plague, while also the psychological terror of observing the sickness and death through his window and being unable to aid the victims and secure his own health. The mystery of the cause of the spread of the plague pervades the short film; the periwig maker rhetorically records in his journal his speculations of the cause but is never able discover the answer. The young orphan, another common component of the Gothic, takes center stage of the story when we see her mother's corpse being carried away and her subsequent death-inducing contraction of the plague. The supernatural is incorporated into the story with the apparition of the young redhead; it remains unclear if this is a construct of his psyche or an actual occurrence. Death dominates and lingers not only with the plague victims but also in the air that transmits the illness and then finally in the wigs that contain the hair of the deceased. Though the Periwig Maker has escaped the clutches of the plague, the last scene of him wearing the red-haired wig indicates that he has lost some semblance of sanity. Therefore, far after the plague has dispelled, his psychological degradation and madness remain.

== Awards ==
- 2000 Best Short Fiction Film – Children's Jury: 24th Annecy International Animation Film Festival, 2000
- 2000 Best Animated Short Film: BAFTA Awards, 2000
- 2000 Special Recognition for Excellence: Aspen Shortsfest, 2000
- 2000 Special Distinction: 40th Kraków International Short Film Festival, 2000
- 2000 Best Short Film: 26th Seattle International Film Festival, 2000
- 2000 Best First Film: 14th Animafest Zagreb: World Festival of Animated Film, 2000
- 2000 Grand Prize for Short Film: 4th Puchon International Fantastic Film Festival, 2000
- 2000 Special International Jury Prize: 8th Hiroshima International Animation Festival, 2000
- 2000 Best First Professional Film: Ottawa International Animation Festival, 2000
- 2000 Best First Film: 7th I Castelli Animati: International Animated Film Festival, 2000
- 2000 Best Animation Film: 4th LA Shorts Fest, 2000
- 2000 Special Mention of the Ecumenical Jury: 43rd DOK Leipzig: International Leipzig Festival for Documentary and Animated Film, 2000
- 2000 Best European Film: 24th Cinanima: International Animated Film Festival, 2000
- 2001-Best Animated Short Film: 73rd Academy Awards (nominated)
