= Robert Hooper (physician) =

British physician and medical writer

Robert Hooper (1773–1835) was a British physician, known as a medical writer.

== Life ==
The son of John Hooper of Marylebone, he was born in London. After a course of medical study in London he was appointed apothecary to the Marylebone workhouse infirmary. He entered Pembroke College, Oxford, on 24 October 1796, graduated B.A. in 1803, M.A. and M.B. in 1804. He was prevented from proceeding to D.M. at the University of Oxford, but he was created M.D. of the University of St Andrews on 16 December 1805, and admitted licentiate of the Royal College of Physicians on 23 December 1805.

Settling in Savile Row, Hooper lectured there on the practice of medicine. He made a study of pathology, and formed a collection of illustrative specimens. He retired from practice in 1829, having made a fortune, and lived at Stanmore.

Hooper died in Bentinck Street, Manchester Square, on 6 May 1835, in his sixty-third year.

== Works ==
While still a practising physician, he was an industrious writer. His books sold well, and revised editions remained in print to the end of the century. Hooper wrote:

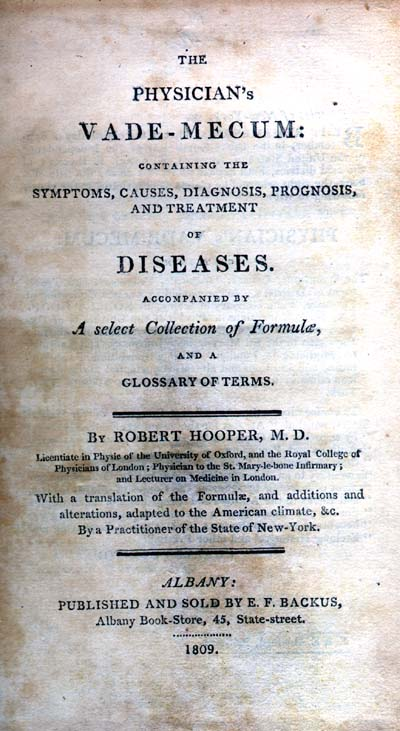
The Physician's Vade Mecum, title page from the 1809 American edition.

- Observations on the Structure and Economy of Plants; to which is added the Analogy between the Animal and Vegetable Kingdoms, Oxford, 1797.
- The Hygrology; or Chemico-Physiological Doctrine of the Fluids of the Human Body. From the Latin of J. J. Plenck, London, 1797. Translation from Joseph Jakob Plenck.
- A Compendious Medical Dictionary, containing an Explanation of the Terms in Anatomy, Physiology, Surgery, London, 1798; 6th edit., 1831; numerous American editions were issued. The edition of 1811 was issued as a new edition of John Quincy's Lexicon Medicum, a work which had gone through thirteen editions, largely copied by Hooper. Subsequent editions bore the title Lexicon Medicum, or Medical Dictionary, without reference to Quincy. OL 5228057W
- The Anatomist's Vade Mecum, containing the Anatomy, Physiology, and Morbid Appearances of the Human Body, London, 1798; 4th edit., 1802; American editions, Boston, 1801, 1803. OL 5228059W
- Anatomical Plates of the Bones and Muscles, reduced from Albinus, for the use of Students and Artists, London, 1802; 3rd edit., 1807.
- Observations on the Epidemical Diseases now prevailing in London, London, 1803.
- The London Dissector, London, 1804. OL 5228056W
- Examinations in Anatomy, Physiology, and Pharmacy, London, 1807; 4th edit., 1820.
- The Physician's Vade Mecum, containing the Symptoms, Causes, Prognosis, and Treatment of Diseases, London, 1809; enlarged edition, 1833; many American editions. OL 5228058W
- The Surgeons Vade Mecum, London [etc], 1809 OL 5228055W
- Anatomical Plates of the Thoracic and Abdominal Viscera, 3rd edit., 1809.
- The Morbid Anatomy of the Human Brain, being Illustrations of the most frequent and important Organic Diseases to which that viscus is subject, London, 1826.
- The Morbid Anatomy of the Human Uterus and its Appendages, with Illustrations of the most frequent and important Organic Diseases to which those Viscera are subject, London, 1832.

Drawings for the illustrations were made by John Howship, George Kirtland and John Stewart Jr.
