= Great Plague of London =

Epidemic of bubonic plague, 1665–66

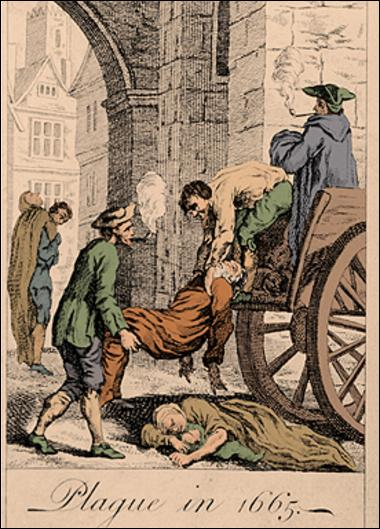
Collecting the dead for burial during the Great Plague

The Great Plague of London, lasting from 1665 to 1666, was the most recent major epidemic of the bubonic plague to occur in England. It happened within the centuries-long Second Pandemic, a period of intermittent bubonic plague epidemics that originated in Central Asia in 1331 (the first year of the Black Death), and included related diseases such as pneumonic plague and septicemic plague, which lasted until 1750.

The Great Plague killed an estimated 100,000 people—almost a quarter of London's population—in 18 months. The plague was caused by the Yersinia pestis bacterium, which is usually transmitted to a human by the bite of a flea or louse.

The 1665–66 epidemic was on a much smaller scale than the earlier Black Death pandemic. It became known afterwards as the "great" plague mainly because it was the last widespread outbreak of bubonic plague in England during the 400-year Second Pandemic.

== London in 1665 ==
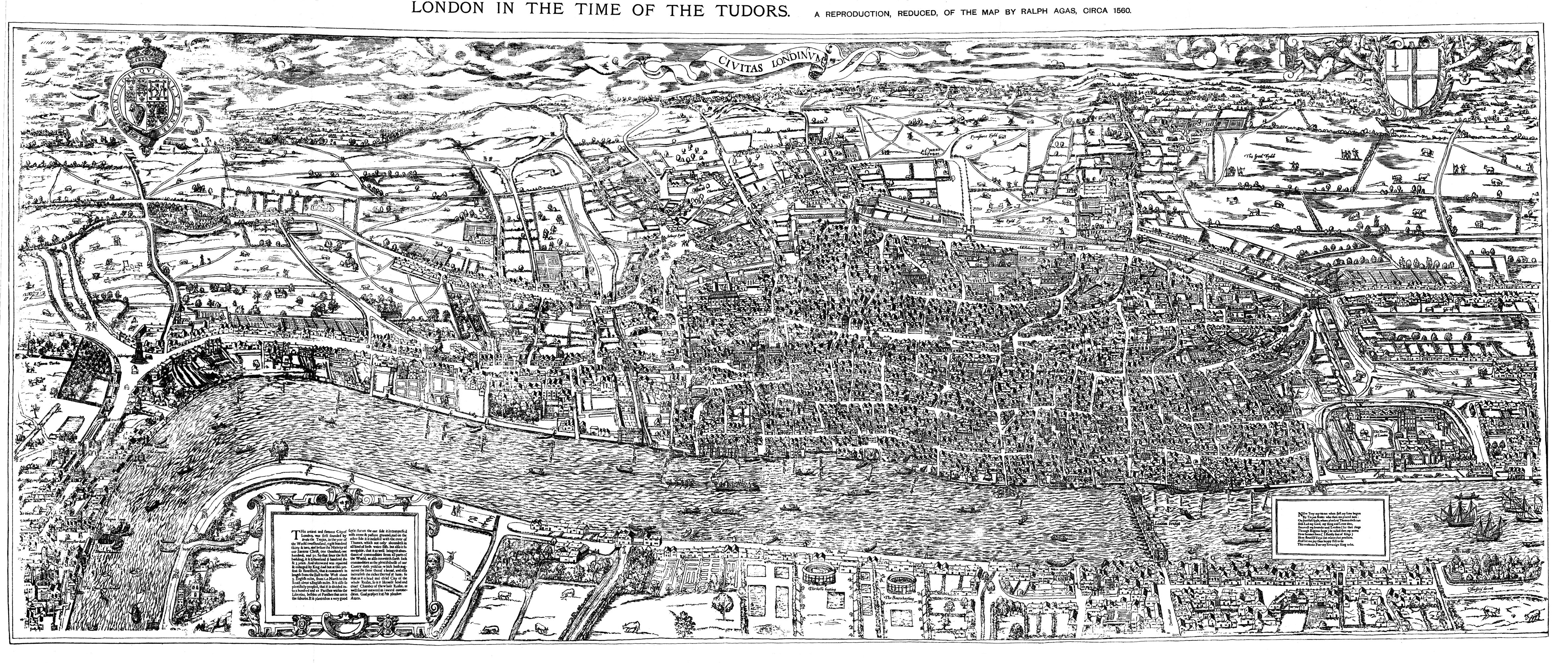
The "Woodcut" map of London, dating from the 1560s

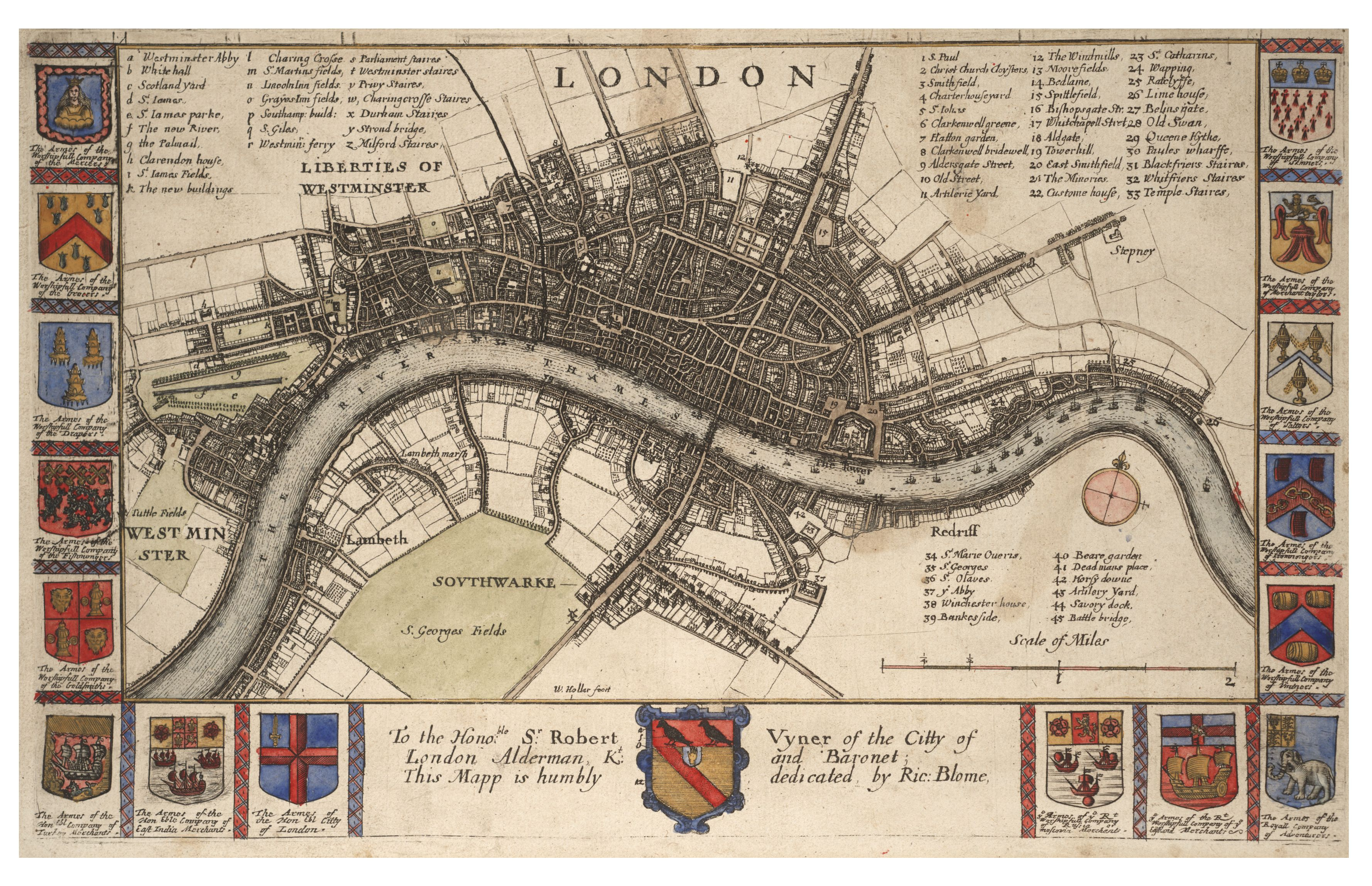
Map of London by Wenceslaus Hollar, c. 1665

The plague was endemic in 17th-century London, as it was in other European cities at the time. The disease periodically erupted into massive epidemics. There were 30,000 deaths due to the plague in 1603, 35,000 in 1625, 10,000 in 1636, and smaller numbers in other years.

In late 1664, a bright comet was seen in the sky, and the people of London became fearful, wondering what evil event it portended. London at that time was a city of about 448 acres surrounded by a city wall that had originally been built to keep out raiding bands, and, in the south, by the River Thames. There were gates in the wall at Ludgate, Newgate, Aldersgate, Cripplegate, Moorgate, Bishopsgate and Aldgate, and the Thames was crossable at London Bridge. In the poorer parts of the city, filled with overcrowded tenements and garrets, hygiene was impossible to maintain. There was no sanitation, and open drains flowed along the centre of winding streets. The cobbles were slippery with animal droppings, rubbish and the slops thrown out of the houses; they were muddy and buzzing with flies in summer, and awash with sewage in winter. The City Corporation employed "rakers" to remove the worst of the filth, and it was transported to mounds outside the walls, where it accumulated and continued to decompose. The stench was overwhelming, and people walked around with handkerchiefs or nosegays pressed against their nostrils.

Some of the city's necessities, such as coal, arrived by barge, but most came by road. Carts, carriages, horses and pedestrians were crowded together, and the gateways in the wall formed bottlenecks through which it was difficult to progress. The nineteen-arch London Bridge was even more congested. Those who were better-off used hackney carriages and sedan chairs to get to their destinations without getting filthy. The poor walked, and might be drenched by water tossed up by wheeled vehicles, slops thrown into the street, or water pouring off overhanging roofs. Another hazard was the choking black smoke belching forth from soap factories, breweries, iron smelters and about 15,000 households that were burning coal to heat their homes.

Outside the city walls, shanty towns with wooden shacks and no sanitation had sprung up, providing homes for the craftsmen and tradespeople who had flocked to the already overcrowded city. The government had tried to limit the development of these "suburbs", but had failed: Over a quarter of a million people lived in them. When Royalists had fled the country during the Commonwealth, they had left many fine town houses vacant, and some immigrants to London had crowded into them, converting them into tenements that housed different families in every room. These properties were soon vandalised and became rat-infested.

The City of London proper was administered by the Lord Mayor, the Aldermen and the common councillors, but some parts of the greater metropolitan area were not legally part of the city. Some of these areas, both inside the City walls and outside its boundaries, had long been organised into districts of various sizes, called "liberties", that had historically been granted rights to self-government. (Many had originally been associated with the religious institutions that were abolished in the Dissolution of the Monasteries, whereupon their historic rights and property had been transferred to secular owners.)

By 1665, the walled City was surrounded by a ring of liberties which had come under its authority, and these had come to be referred to collectively as 'the City and Liberties'. However, this area was surrounded by additional suburbs with other independent administrations. For example, Westminster was an independent town with its own liberties, joined to London by urban development, and the Tower of London was an independent liberty. Areas that were not part of any of these various independent administrations came under the authority of the county of Middlesex if they were north of the river, and under the authority of Surrey if they were south of the river.

At that time, bubonic plague was a much feared disease, but its cause was not understood. Many mistakenly blamed emanations from the earth, "pestilential effluvia", unusual weather, sickness in livestock, abnormal behaviour of animals or an increase in the numbers of moles, frogs, mice or flies. It was not until 1894 that its causal agent, the bacterium Yersinia pestis, was identified by Alexandre Yersin, and its transmission by rat fleas became known. Although the Great Plague in London was long assumed to be bubonic plague, caused by Yersinia pestis, this was only confirmed (by DNA analysis) in 2016. It is now believed that human body lice also played a key role in causing infections, perhaps more so than rats.

== The recording of deaths ==
In order to judge the severity of an epidemic, it is first necessary to know how big the population was in which it occurred. There was no official census of the population to provide this figure, and the best contemporary count comes from the work of John Graunt (1620–1674), who was one of the earliest Fellows of the Royal Society and one of the first demographers, bringing a scientific approach to the collection of statistics. In 1662, he estimated that 384,000 people lived in the City of London, the Liberties, Westminster and the out-parishes, based on figures in the Bills of Mortality published each week in the capital. These different districts with different administrations constituted the officially recognized extent of London as a whole. In 1665, he revised his estimate to "not above 460,000". Other contemporaries put the figure higher (the French Ambassador, for example, suggested 600,000), but with no mathematical basis to support their estimates. The next largest city in the kingdom was Norwich, with a population of 30,000.

There was no duty to report a death to anyone in authority. Instead, each parish appointed two or more "searchers of the dead", whose duty was to inspect a corpse and determine the cause of death. A searcher was entitled to charge a small fee from relatives for each death they reported, and so habitually the parish would appoint someone to the post who would otherwise be destitute and would be receiving support from the parish poor rate. Typically, this meant searchers would be old women who were illiterate, might know little about identifying diseases and who would be open to dishonesty. Searchers would typically learn about a death either from the local sexton who had been asked to dig a grave or from the tolling of a church bell. Anyone who did not report a death to their local church, such as Quakers, Anabaptists, other non-Anglican Christians or Jews, frequently did not get included in the official records. Searchers during times of plague were required to live apart from the community, avoid other people and carry a white stick to warn of their occupation when outdoors, and stay indoors except when performing their duties, to avoid spreading the diseases. Searchers reported to the Parish Clerk, who made a return each week to the Company of Parish Clerks in Brode Lane. Figures were then passed to the Lord Mayor and then to the Minister of State once plague became a matter of national concern. The reported figures were used to compile the Bills of Mortality, which listed total deaths in each parish and whether by the plague. The system of Searchers to report the cause of death continued until 1836.

Graunt recorded the incompetence of the Searchers at identifying true causes of death, remarking on the frequent recording of 'consumption' rather than other diseases which were recognized then by physicians. He suggested a cup of ale and a doubling of their fee to two groats rather than one was sufficient for Searchers to change the cause of death to one more convenient for the householders. No one wished to be known as having had a death by plague in their household, and Parish Clerks, too, connived in covering up cases of plague in their official returns. Analysis of the Bills of Mortality during the months plague took hold shows a rise in deaths other than by plague well above the average death rate, a tell-tale sign of misrepresentation of the true cause of death. As plague spread, a system of quarantine was introduced, whereby any house where someone had died from plague would be locked up and no one allowed to enter or leave for 40 days. This frequently led to the deaths of the other inhabitants, by neglect if not from the plague, and provided ample incentive not to report the disease. The official returns record 68,596 cases of plague, but a reasonable estimate suggests this figure is 30,000 short of the true total. A plague house was marked with a red cross on the door with the words "Lord have mercy upon us", and a watchman stood guard outside.

== Preventive measures ==
Reports of plague around Europe began to reach England in the 1660s, causing the Privy Council to consider what steps might be taken to prevent it crossing to England. Quarantining (isolation) of ships had been used during previous outbreaks and was again introduced for ships coming to London in November 1663, following outbreaks in Amsterdam and Hamburg. Two naval ships were assigned to intercept any vessels entering the Thames estuary. Ships from infected ports were required to moor in Holehaven near Canvey Island for a trentine – period of 30 days – before being allowed to travel up-river. Ships from ports free of plague or completing their isolation period were given a certificate of health and allowed to travel on. A second inspection line was established between the forts on opposite banks of the Thames at Tilbury and Gravesend with instructions to pass only ships with a certificate.

The isolation period was increased to forty days – a quarantine – in May 1664 as the continental plague worsened, and the areas subject to quarantine changed with the news of the spread of plague to include all of Holland, Zeeland and Friesland (all regions of the Dutch Republic); restrictions on Hamburg were removed in November. Quarantine measures against ships coming from the Dutch Republic were put in place in 29 other ports from May, starting with Great Yarmouth. The Dutch ambassador objected at the constraint of trade with his country, but England responded that it had been one of the last countries introducing such restrictions. Regulations were enforced quite strictly, so that people or houses where voyagers had come ashore without serving their quarantine were also subjected to 40 days of quarantine.

== Outbreak ==
Plague was one of the hazards of life in Britain from its dramatic appearance in 1348 with the Black Death. The Bills of Mortality began to be published regularly in 1603, in which year 33,347 deaths were recorded from plague. Between then and 1665, only four years had no recorded cases. In 1563, a thousand people were reportedly dying in London each week. In 1593, there were 15,003 deaths, 1625 saw 41,313 dead, between 1640 and 1646 came 11,000 deaths, culminating in 3,597 for 1647. The 1625 outbreak was recorded at the time as the 'Great Plague', until deaths from the plague of 1665 surpassed it. These official figures are likely to under-report actual numbers.

=== Early days ===
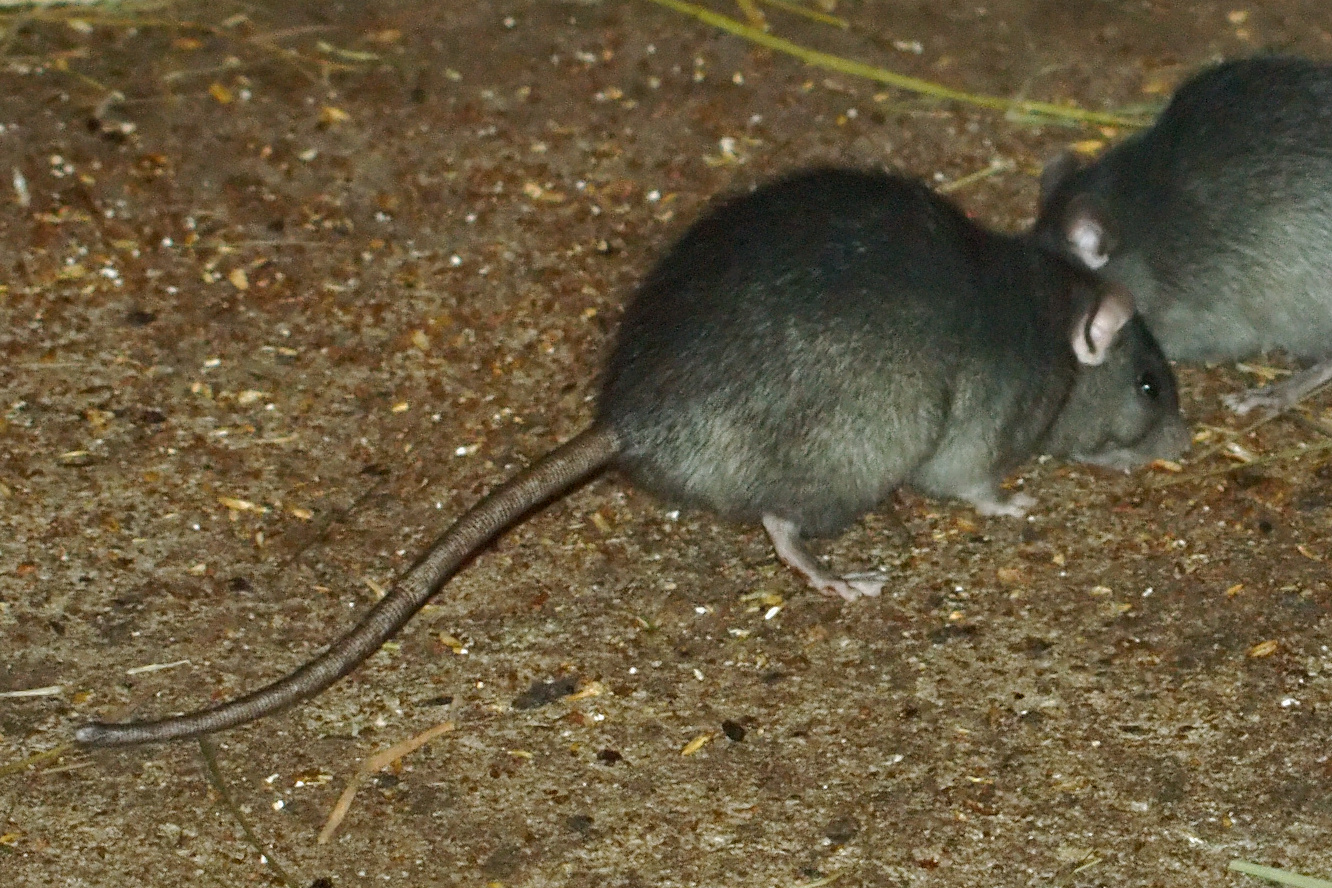
Rattus rattus, the black rat. Smaller than Rattus norvegicus, the brown rat, which later supplanted it, it is also keener to live near humankind. Timber houses and overcrowded slums provided excellent homes. The link between the rat as reservoir of infection and host to fleas which could transfer to man was not understood. Efforts were made to eliminate cats and dogs: if anything, this encouraged the rats. Body lice were also important plague vectors.

Plague was sufficiently uncommon that medical practitioners might have had no personal experience of seeing the disease; medical training varied from those who had attended the college of physicians, to apothecaries who also acted as doctors, to charlatans. Other diseases abounded, such as an outbreak of smallpox the year before, and these uncertainties all added to difficulties identifying the true start of the epidemic. Contemporary accounts suggest cases of plague occurred through the winter of 1664–65, some of which were fatal but a number of which did not display the virulence of the later epidemic. The winter was cold, the ground frozen from December to March, river traffic on the Thames twice blocked by ice, and it may be that the cold weather held back its spread.

This outbreak of bubonic plague in England is thought to have spread from the Netherlands, where the disease had been occurring intermittently since 1599. It is unclear exactly where the disease first struck but the initial contagion may have arrived with Dutch trading ships carrying bales of cotton from Amsterdam, which was ravaged by the disease in 1663–64, with a mortality given of 50,000. The first areas to be struck are believed to be the dock areas just outside London, and the parish of St Giles. In both of these localities, poor workers were crowded into ill-kept structures. Two suspicious deaths were recorded in St Giles parish in 1664 and another in February 1665. These did not appear as plague deaths on the Bills of Mortality, so no control measures were taken by the authorities, but the total number of people dying in London during the first four months of 1665 showed a marked increase. By the end of April, only four plague deaths had been recorded, two in the parish of St. Giles, but total deaths per week had risen from around 290 to 398. On 30 April 1665, Samuel Pepys noted the first cases of the plague having taken place in the parish of St Michael, Crooked Lane.

There had been three official cases in April, a level of plague which in earlier years had not induced any official response, but the Privy Council now acted to introduce household quarantine. Justices of the Peace in Middlesex were instructed to investigate any suspected cases and to shut up the house if it was confirmed. Shortly after, a similar order was issued by the King's Bench to the City and Liberties. A riot broke out in St. Giles when the first house was sealed up; the crowd broke down the door and released the inhabitants. Rioters caught were punished severely. Instructions were given to build pest-houses, which were essentially isolation hospitals built away from other people where the sick could be cared for (or stay until they died). This official activity suggests that despite the few recorded cases, the government was already aware that this was a serious outbreak of plague.

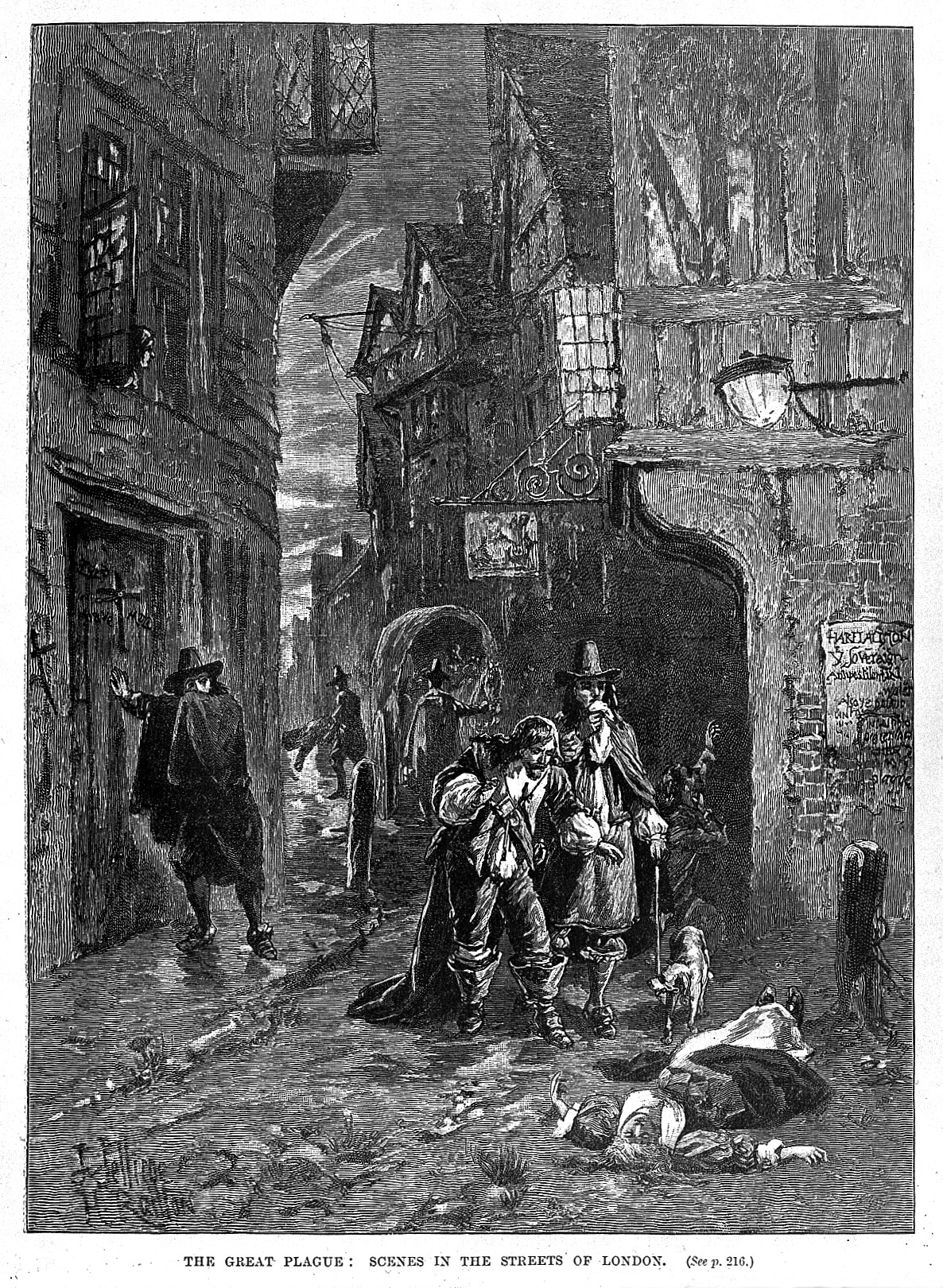
Two men discovering a dead woman in the street

With the arrival of warmer weather, the disease began to take a firmer hold. In the week 2–9 May, there were three recorded deaths in the parish of St Giles, four in neighbouring St Clement Danes and one each in St Andrew Holborn and St Mary Woolchurch Haw. Only the last was actually inside the city walls. A Privy Council committee was formed to investigate methods to best prevent the spread of plague, and measures were introduced to close some of the ale houses in affected areas and limit the number of lodgers allowed in a household. In the city, the Lord Mayor issued a proclamation that all householders must diligently clean the streets outside their property, which was a householder's responsibility, not a state one (the city employed scavengers and rakers to remove the worst of the mess). Matters just became worse, and Aldermen were instructed to find and punish those failing their duty. As cases in St. Giles began to rise, an attempt was made to quarantine the area and constables were instructed to inspect everyone wishing to travel and contain inside vagrants or suspect persons.

People began to be alarmed. Samuel Pepys, who had an important position at the Admiralty, stayed in London and provided a contemporary account of the plague through his diary. On 30 April he wrote: "Great fears of the sickness here in the City it being said that two or three houses are already shut up. God preserve us all!" Another source of information on the time is A Journal of the Plague Year, which was written by Daniel Defoe and published in 1722. He had been only five when the plague struck but made use of his family's recollections (his uncle was a saddler in East London and his father a butcher in Cripplegate), interviews with survivors and sight of such official records as were available.

The onset of the disease was recalled two years later by Puritan minister Thomas Vincent:

It was in the month of May that the Plague was first taken notice of; our Bill of Mortality did let us know but of three which died of the disease in the whole year before; but in the beginning of May the bill tells us of nine...fear quickly begins to creep upon peoples hearts; great thoughts and discourse there is in Town about the Plague, and they cast in their minds whether they should go if the Plague should increase. Yet when the next weeks Bill signifieth to them the disease from nine to three their minds are something appeased; discourse of that subject cools; fears are hushed, and hopes take place, that the black cloud did but threaten, and give a few drops; but the wind would drive it away. But when in the next Bill the number of the dead by the Plague is mounted from three to fourteen, and in the next to seventeen, and in the next to forty-three, and the disease begins so much to increase, and disperse. Now secure sinners begin to be startled, and those who would have slept at quiet still in their nests, are unwillingly awakened.

=== Exodus from the city ===
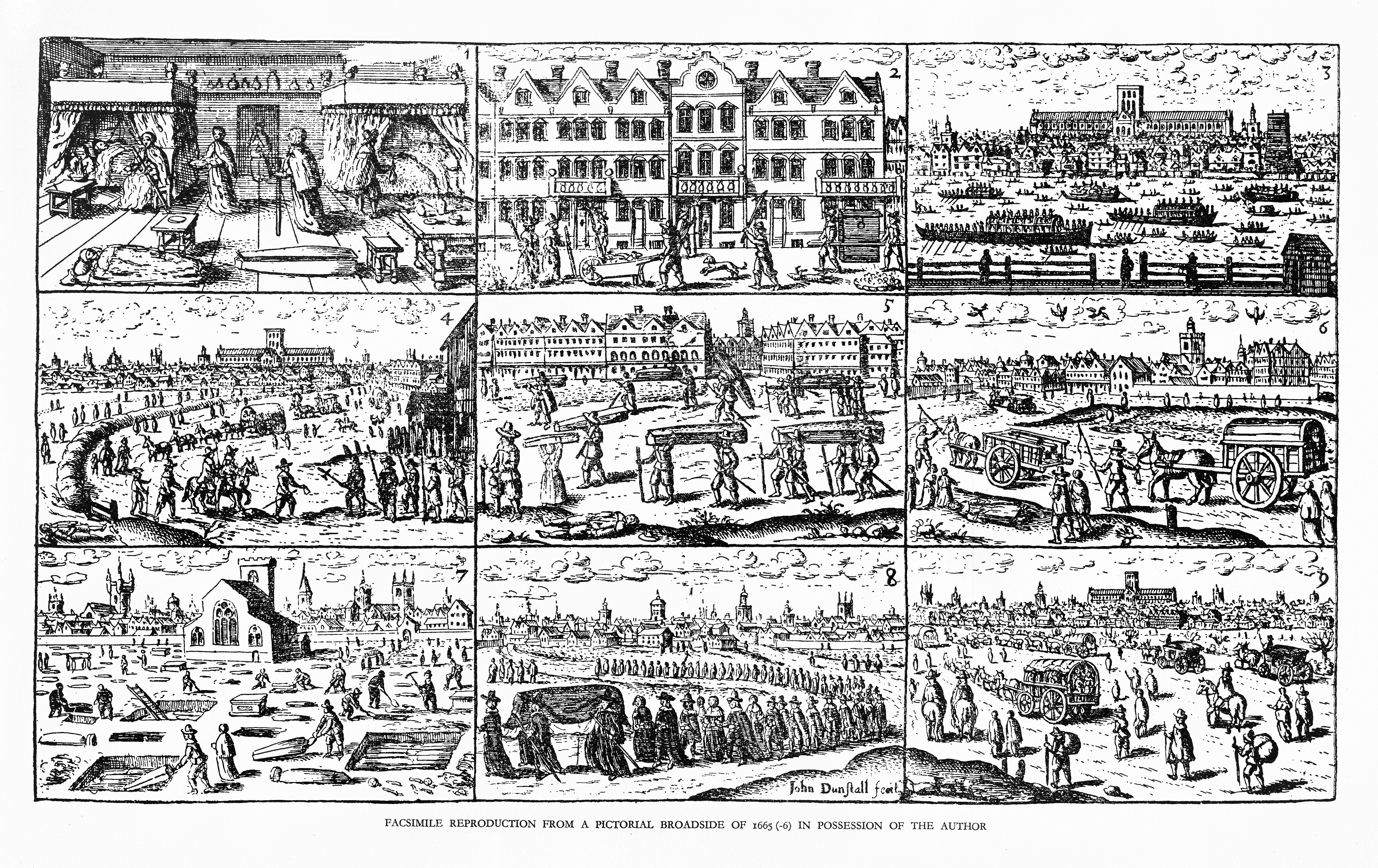
Scenes in London during the plague

By July 1665, plague was rampant in the City of London. The rich ran away, including King Charles II of England, his family and his court, who left the city for Salisbury, moving on to Oxford in September when some cases of plague occurred in Salisbury. The aldermen and most of the other city authorities opted to stay at their posts. The Lord Mayor of London, Sir John Lawrence, also decided to stay in the city. Businesses were closed when merchants and professionals fled. Defoe wrote "Nothing was to be seen but wagons and carts, with goods, women, servants, children, coaches filled with people of the better sort, and horsemen attending them, and all hurrying away". As the plague raged throughout the summer, only a small number of clergymen, physicians and apothecaries remained to cope with an increasingly large number of victims. Ellen Cotes, author of London's Dreadful Visitation, expressed the hope that "Neither the Physicians of our Souls or Bodies may hereafter in such great numbers forsake us".

The poorer people were also alarmed by the contagion and some left the city, but it was not easy for them to abandon their accommodation and livelihoods for an uncertain future elsewhere. Before exiting through the city gates, they were required to possess a certificate of good health signed by the Lord Mayor and these became increasingly difficult to obtain. As time went by and the numbers of plague victims rose, people living in the villages outside London began to resent this exodus and were no longer prepared to accept townsfolk from London, with or without a certificate. The refugees were turned back, were not allowed to pass through towns and had to travel across country, and were forced to live rough on what they could steal or scavenge from the fields. Many died in wretched circumstances of starvation and dehydration in the hot summer that was to follow.

=== Height of the epidemic ===
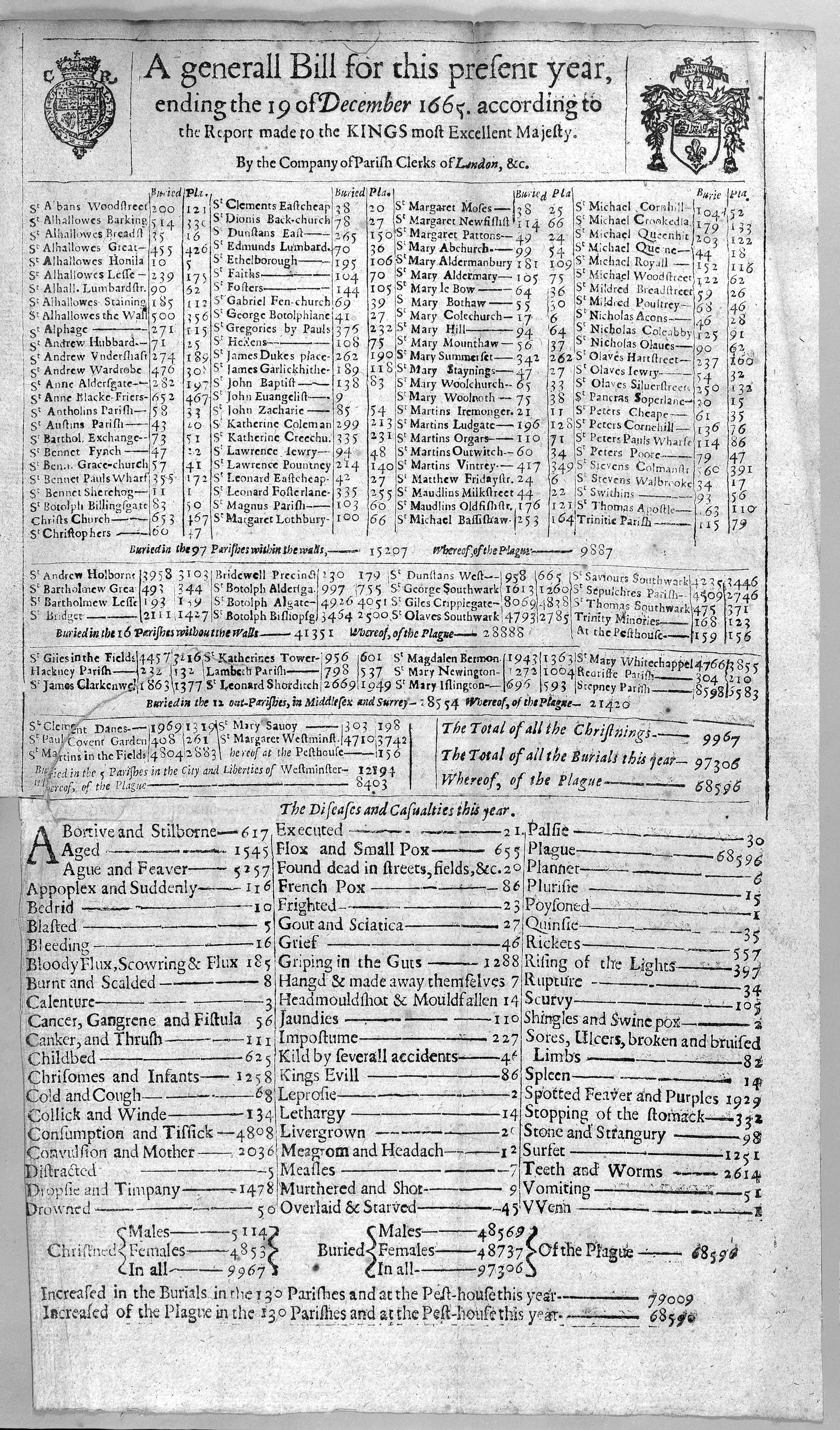
A Bill of Mortality for the plague in 1665

In the last week of July, the London Bill of Mortality showed 3,014 deaths, of which 2,020 had died from the plague. The number of deaths as a result of plague may have been underestimated, as deaths in other years in the same period were much lower, at around 300. As the number of victims affected mounted up, burial grounds became overfull, and pits were dug to accommodate the dead. Drivers of dead-carts travelled the streets calling "Bring out your dead" and carted away piles of bodies. The authorities became concerned that the number of deaths might cause public alarm and ordered that body removal and interment should take place only at night. As time went on, there were too many victims, and too few drivers, to remove the bodies which began to be stacked up against the walls of houses. Daytime collection was resumed and the plague pits became mounds of decomposing corpses. In the parish of Aldgate, a great hole was dug near the churchyard, fifty feet long and twenty feet wide. Digging was continued by labourers at one end while the dead-carts tipped in corpses at the other. When there was no room for further extension it was dug deeper until ground water was reached at twenty feet. When finally covered with earth it housed 1,114 corpses.

Plague doctors traversed the streets diagnosing victims, many of them without formal medical training. Several public health efforts were attempted. Physicians were hired by city officials and burial details were carefully organized, but panic spread through the city and, out of the fear of contagion, bodies were hastily buried in overcrowded pits. The means of transmission of the disease were not known but thinking they might be linked to the animals, the City Corporation ordered a cull of dogs and cats. This decision may have extended the length of the epidemic since those animals could have helped keep in check the rat population carrying the fleas which transmitted the disease. Thinking bad air was involved in transmission, the authorities ordered giant bonfires to be burned in the streets and house fires to be kept burning night and day, in the hope that the air would be cleansed. Tobacco was thought to be a prophylactic and it was later said that no London tobacconist had died from the plague during the epidemic.

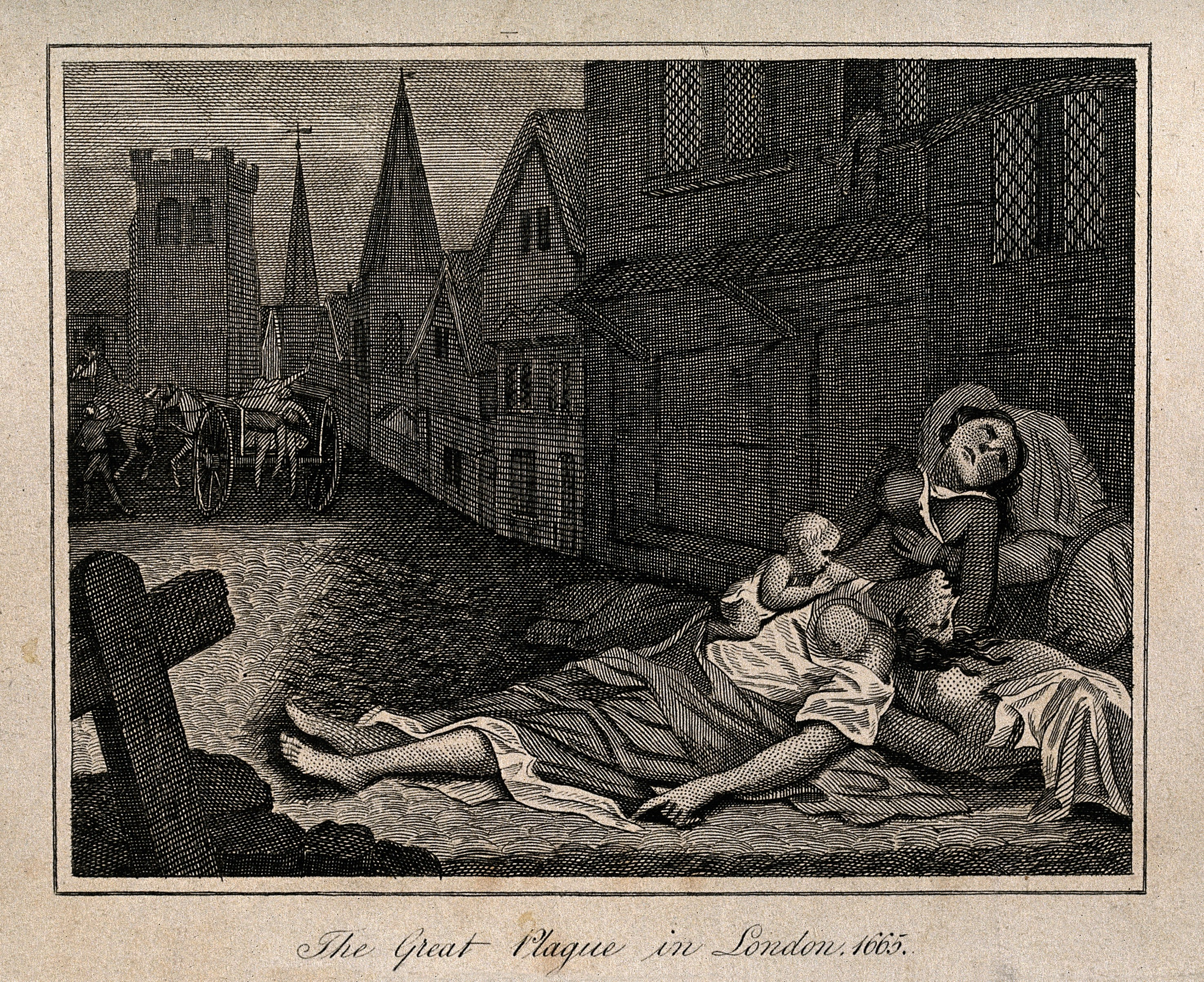
Two women lying dead in a London street

Trade and business had dried up, and the streets were empty of people except for the dead-carts and the dying victims, as witnessed and recorded by Samuel Pepys in his diary: "Lord! How empty the streets are and how melancholy, so many poor sick people in the streets full of sores… in Westminster, there is never a physician and but one apothecary left, all being dead." That people did not starve was down to the foresight of Sir John Lawrence and the Corporation of London who arranged for a commission of one farthing to be paid above the normal price for every quarter of corn landed in the Port of London. Another food source was the villages around London which, denied of their usual sales in the capital, left vegetables in specified market areas, negotiated their sale by shouting, and collected their payment after the money had been left submerged in a bucket of vinegar to "disinfect" the coins.

Records state that plague deaths in London and the suburbs crept up over the summer from 2,000 people per week to over 7,000 per week in September. These figures are likely to be a considerable underestimate. Many of the sextons and parish clerks who kept the records themselves died. Quakers refused to co-operate and many of the poor were just dumped into mass graves unrecorded. It is not clear how many people caught the disease and made a recovery because only deaths were recorded and many records were destroyed in the Great Fire of London the following year. In the few districts where intact records remain, plague deaths varied between 30% and over 50% of the total population.

Vincent wrote:

it was very dismal to behold the red crosses, and read in great letters "LORD, HAVE MERCY UPON US" on the doors, and watchmen standing before them with halberds...people passing by them so gingerly, and with such fearful looks as if they had been lined with enemies in ambush to destroy them...a man at the corner of Artillery-wall, that as I judge, through the dizziness of his head with the disease, which seized upon him there, had dasht his face against the wall; and when I came by, he lay hanging with his bloody face over the rails, and bleeding upon the ground...I went and spoke to him; he could make no answer, but rattled in the throat, and as I was informed, within half an hour died in the place. It would be endless to speak of what we have seen and heard, of some in their frenzy, rising out of their beds, and leaping about their rooms; others crying and roaring at their windows; some coming forth almost naked, and running into the streets...scarcely a day passed over my head for, I think, a month or more together, but I should hear of the death of some one or more that I knew. The first day that they were smitten, the next day some hopes of recovery, and the third day, that they were dead.

The outbreak was concentrated in London, but it affected other areas as well. Perhaps the best known example occurred in the village of Eyam in Derbyshire. The plague allegedly arrived with a merchant carrying a parcel of cloth sent from London. The villagers imposed a quarantine on themselves to stop the further spread of the disease. This prevented the disease from moving into surrounding areas, but around 33% of the village's inhabitants died over a period of fourteen months. Other places hit hard included Derby and Norwich. In Bristol strenuous efforts by the City Council seems to have limited the death rate to c.0.6 per cent during an outbreak lasting from April to September 1666.

== Aftermath ==
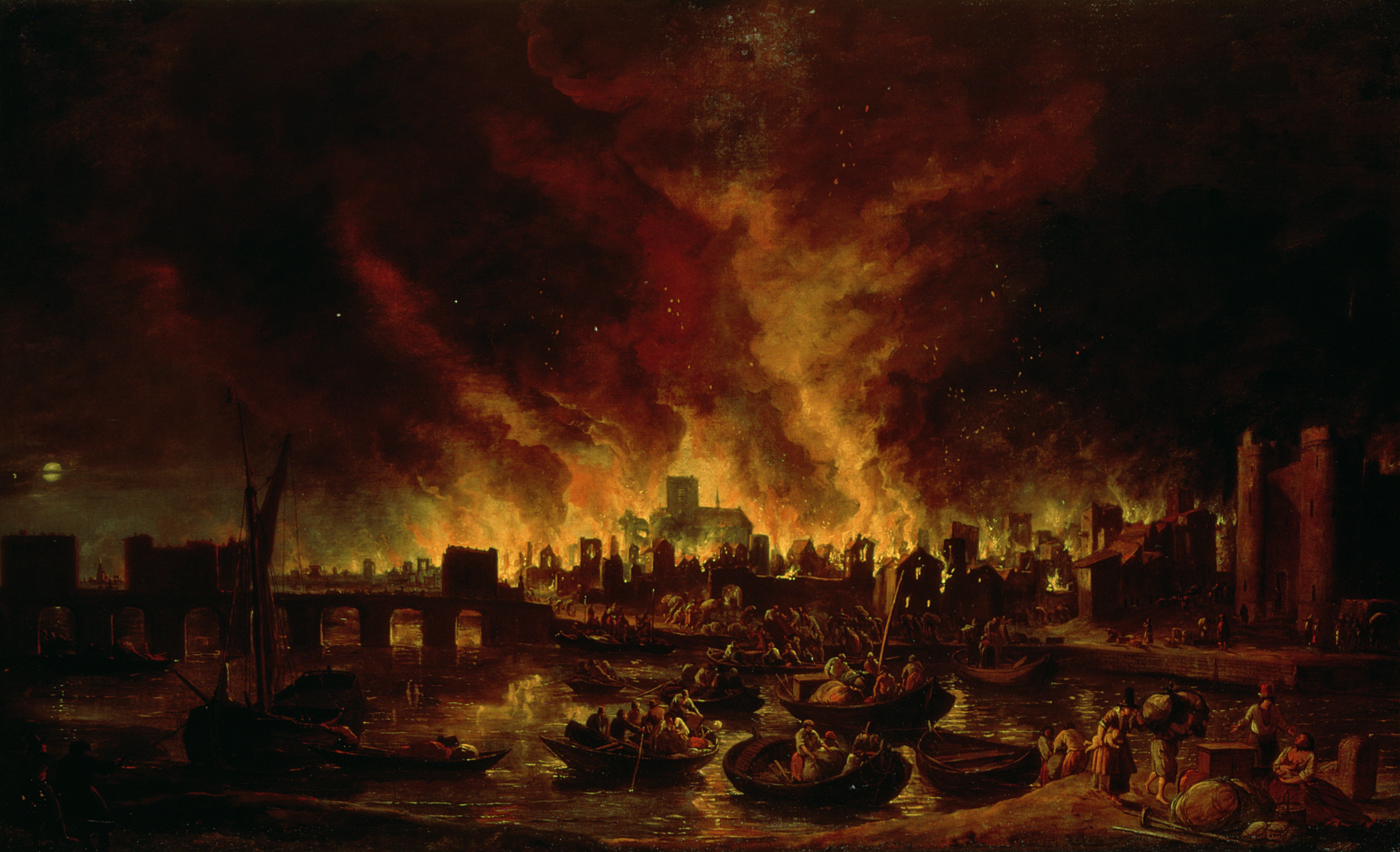
Great Fire of London

By late autumn, the death toll in London and the suburbs began to slow until, in February 1666, it was considered safe enough for the King and his entourage to come back to the city. With the return of the monarch, others began to return: The gentry returned in their carriages accompanied by carts piled high with their belongings. The judges moved back from Windsor to sit in Westminster Hall; Parliament, which had been prorogued in April 1665, did not reconvene until September 1666. Trade recommenced and businesses and workshops opened up. London was the goal of a new wave of people who flocked to the city in expectation of making their fortunes. Writing at the end of March 1666, Lord Clarendon, the Lord Chancellor, stated "... the streets were as full, the Exchange as much crowded, the people in all places as numerous as they had ever been seen ...".

Plague cases continued to occur sporadically at a modest rate until mid-1666. That September, the Great Fire of London destroyed much of the City of London, and some people believed that the fire put an end to the epidemic. It is now thought that the plague had largely subsided before the fire took place. Most of the later cases of plague were found in the suburbs, and it was the City of London that was destroyed by the fire.

According to the Bills of Mortality, there were in total 68,596 deaths in London from the plague in 1665. Lord Clarendon estimated that the true number of mortalities was probably twice that figure. 1666 saw further deaths in other cities but on a lesser scale. Dr Thomas Gumble, chaplain to the Duke of Albemarle, both of whom had stayed in London for the whole of the epidemic, estimated that the total death count for the country from plague during 1665 and 1666 was about 200,000. Among the more notable death victims were Samuel Fisher, John Lewger and George Starkey.

The Great Plague of 1665/1666 was the most recent major outbreak of bubonic plague in Great Britain. The last recorded death from plague came in 1679, and it was removed as a specific category in the Bills of Mortality after 1703. It spread to other towns in East Anglia and the southeast of England but fewer than ten per cent of parishes outside London had a higher than average death rate during those years. Urban areas were more affected than rural ones; Norwich, Ipswich, Colchester, Southampton and Winchester were badly affected, while the west of England and areas of the English Midlands escaped altogether.

The population of England in 1650 was approximately 5.25 million, which declined to about 4.9 million by 1680, recovering to just over 5 million by 1700. Other diseases, such as smallpox, took a high toll on the population without the contribution by plague. The higher death rate in cities, both generally and specifically from the plague, was made up by continuous immigration, from small towns to larger ones and from the countryside to the towns.

There were no contemporary censuses of London's population, but available records suggest that the population returned to its previous level within a couple of years. Burials in 1667 had returned to 1663 levels, Hearth Tax returns had recovered, and John Graunt contemporarily analysed baptism records and concluded they represented a recovered population. Part of this could be accounted for by the return of wealthy households, merchants and manufacturing industries, all of which needed to replace losses among their staff and took steps to bring in necessary people. Colchester had suffered more severe depopulation, but manufacturing records for cloth suggested that production had recovered or even increased by 1669, and the total population had nearly returned to pre-plague levels by 1674. Other towns did less well: Ipswich was affected less than Colchester, but in 1674, its population had dropped by 18%, more than could be accounted for by the plague deaths alone.

As a proportion of the population who died, the London death toll was less severe than in some other towns. The total of deaths in London was greater than in any previous outbreak for 100 years, though as a proportion of the population, the epidemics in 1563, 1603 and 1625 were comparable or greater. Perhaps around 2.5% of the English population died.

== Impact ==
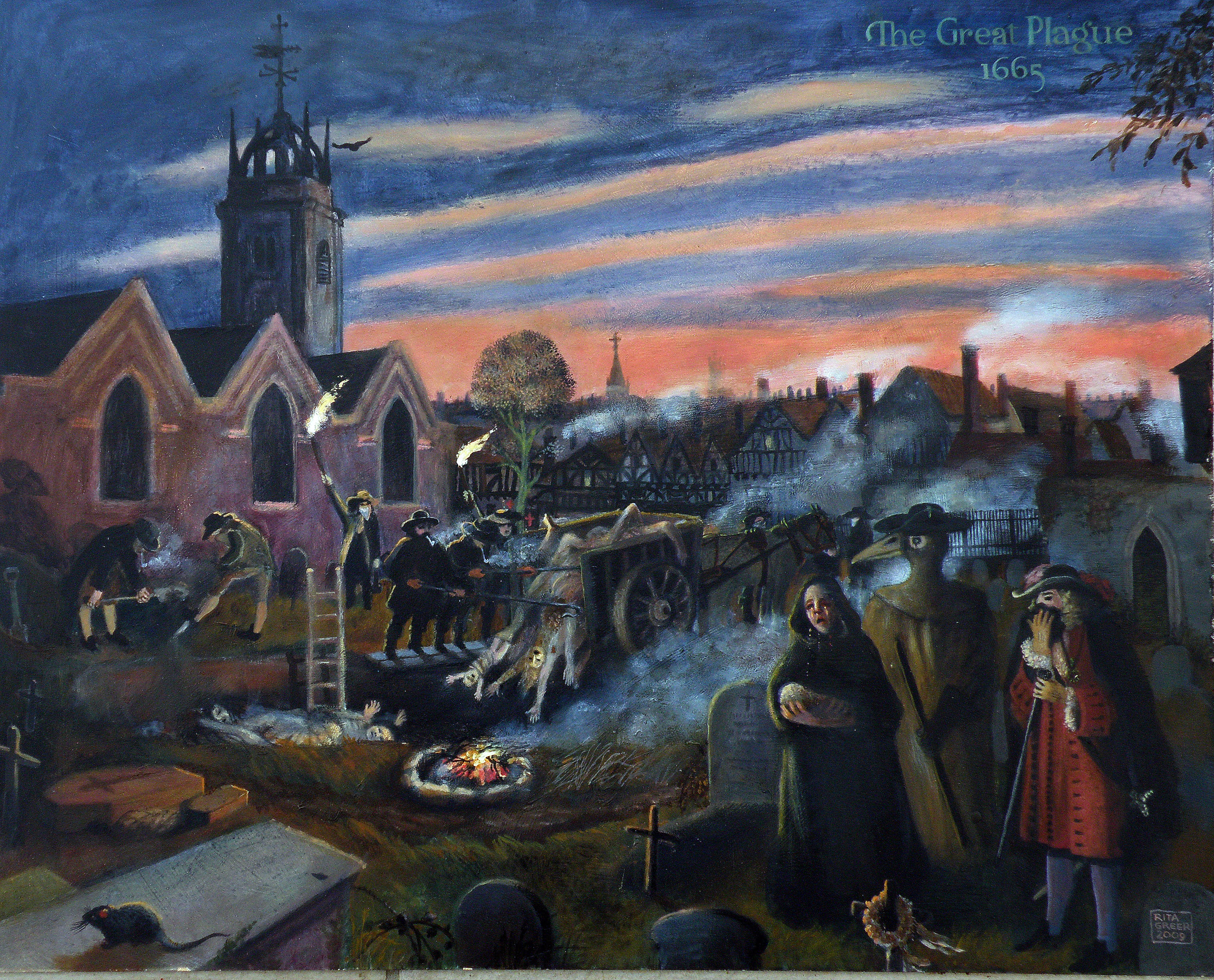
Great Plague of London in 1665 (painting by Rita Greer, 2009)

The plague in London largely affected the poor, as the rich were able to leave the city by either retiring to their country estates or residing with kin in other parts of the country. The subsequent Great Fire of London ruined many city merchants and property owners. As a result of these events, London was largely rebuilt and Parliament enacted the Rebuilding of London Act 1666. The street plan of the capital remained relatively unchanged, but some improvements were made: streets were widened, pavements were created, open sewers abolished, wooden buildings and overhanging gables forbidden, and the design and construction of buildings controlled. The use of brick or stone was mandatory and many gracious buildings were constructed. Not only was the capital rejuvenated, but it became a healthier environment in which to live. Londoners had a greater sense of community after they had overcome the great adversities of 1665 and 1666.

Rebuilding took over ten years and was supervised by Robert Hooke as Surveyor of London. The architect Sir Christopher Wren was involved in the rebuilding of St Paul's Cathedral and more than fifty London churches. King Charles II did much to foster the rebuilding work. He was a patron of the arts and sciences and founded the Royal Observatory and supported the Royal Society, a scientific group whose early members included Robert Hooke, Robert Boyle and Sir Isaac Newton. In fact, out of the fire and pestilence flowed a renaissance in the arts and sciences in England.

Plague pits have been archaeologically excavated during underground construction work. Between 2011 and 2015, 3,500 burials from the 'New Churchyard' or 'Bethlam burial ground' were discovered during the construction of the Crossrail railway at Liverpool Street. Yersinia pestis DNA was found in the teeth of individuals found buried in pits at the site, confirming they had died of bubonic plague.

== See also ==
- 1563 London plague
- 1592–1593 London plague
- Black Death in England
- Derby plague of 1665
- Great Fire of London
- Great Plague of Vienna of 1679
- A Journal of the Plague Year, a 1722 novel by Daniel Defoe about the Great Plague of London
- Loimologia, a first-hand account of the 1665 plague by Dr. Nathaniel Hodges
- Plague doctor contract
- Plague doctor costume
- Old St. Paul's, A Tale of the Plague and the Fire, novel by Harrison Ainsworth
- Plague! The Musical, a 2008 musical by David Massingham and Matt Townend about the Great Plague of London
- "Ring a Ring o' Roses", a nursery rhyme, commonly believed to have arisen at this time
- San Francisco plague of 1900–1904
- Third Pandemic (1855–1960)
