= John Howship =

English surgeon

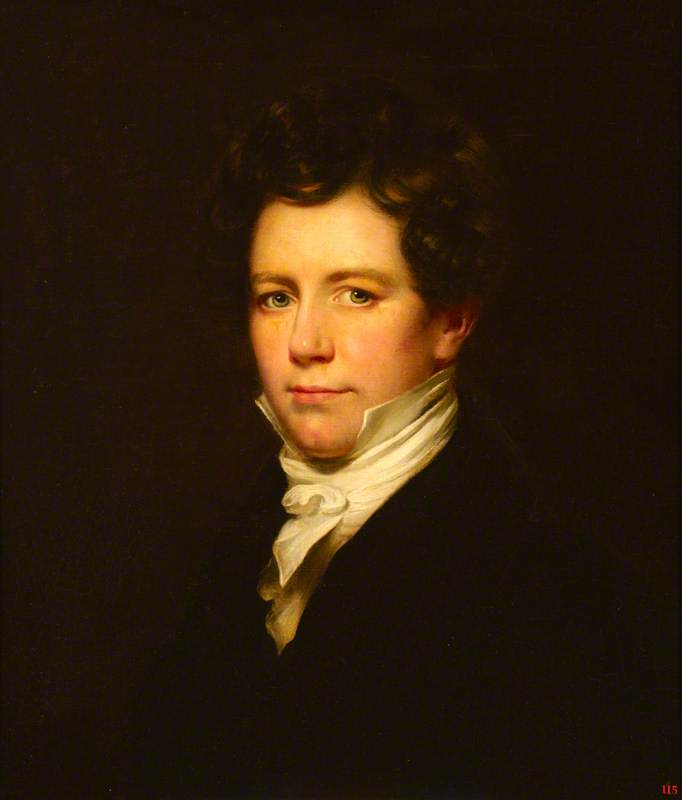
John Howship

John Howship (1781 – 22 January 1841) was an English surgeon remembered for describing the Howship–Romberg sign. He was an assistant surgeon at St. George's Infirmary, London and lecturer at St. George's Hospital Medical School. He was a member of the council of the Royal College of Surgeons at the time of his death from a lower leg abscess.

Howship was an associate of Robert Hooper, working on illustrations for Hooper's books. He also assisted John Heaviside with exhibits for his museum.
