= John Heaviside (surgeon) =

English surgeon

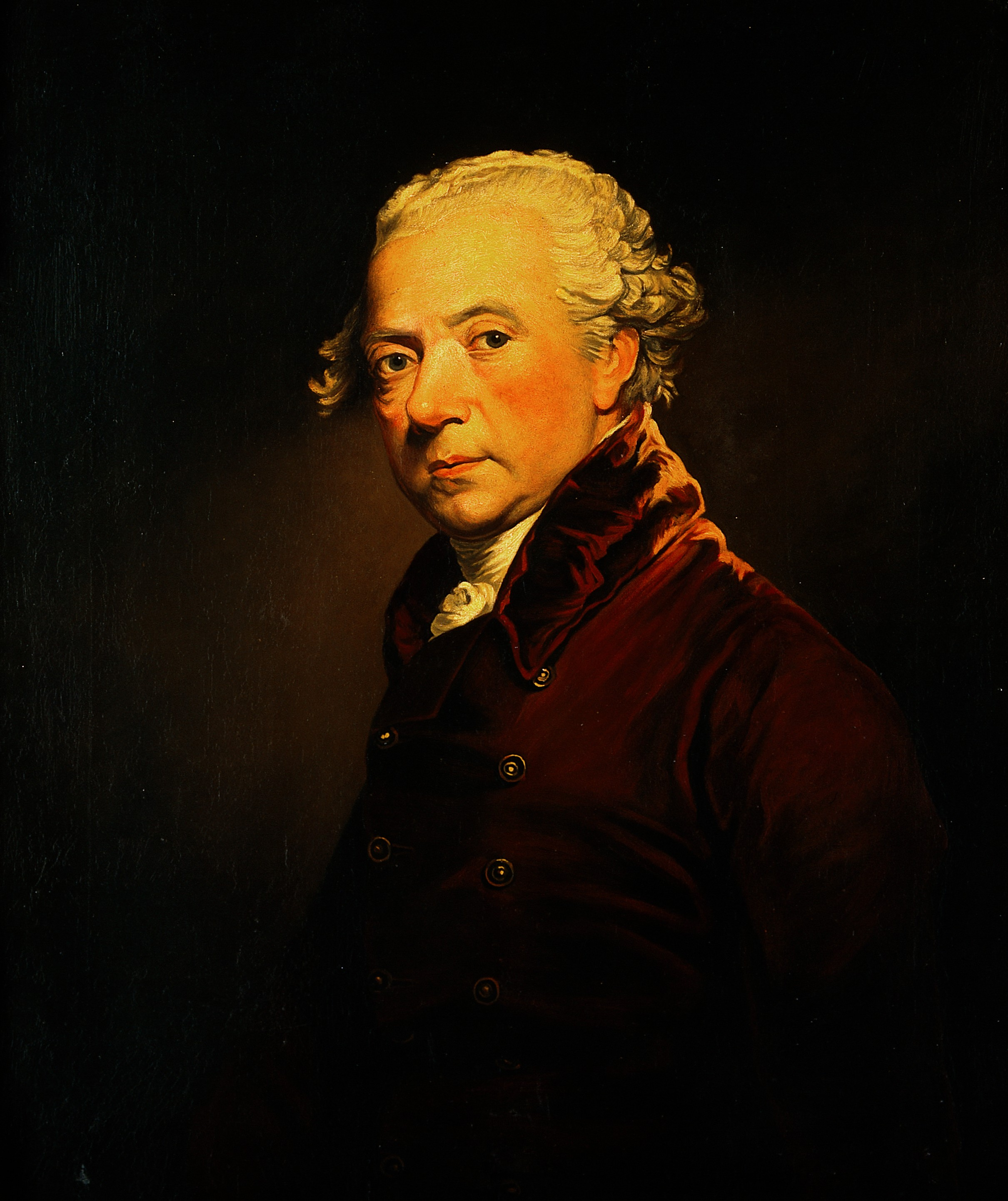
John Heaviside, portrait by Sir William Beechey

John Heaviside (died 1828) was an English surgeon known also as the owner of a museum. He was elected to the Royal Society in 1797.

== Life ==
He was born in Hatfield, Hertfordshire, the son of the surgeon John Heaviside (died 1787) and his wife, Mary Elliott, and was baptised in 1748. He was educated in Chipping Barnet, by David Garrow (1715–1805), father of William Garrow.

In 1764 Heaviside was apprenticed to Charles Dance, a surgeon in Chipping Barnet. He left before the apprenticeship was complete and was placed with Percivall Pott in London.

After a time at St Bartholomew's Hospital, Heaviside was an army surgeon in the Grenadier Guards until 1788. He became a royal surgeon in 1790. He inherited a fortune from his father, and bought a house in Hanover Square to live in, and also in 1793 the medical collection of the surgeon Henry Watson. The house, at 14 George Street, became celebrated as an anatomical museum, and Heaviside published a catalogue in 1818. His assistants included John Howship.

Heaviside was a member of the Eumelian Club founded by John Ash. He spent a week in Newgate Prison in 1803, after attending a duel, with damage to his reputation. After his death in 1828, the museum collection was sold at auction.
