= Hannington-Kiff sign =

Clinical indicator of a medical condition

- Differential diagnosis: Obturator hernia

The Hannington-Kiff sign is a clinical sign in which there is an absent adductor reflex in the thigh in the presence of a positive patellar reflex. It occurs in patients with an obturator hernia, due to compression of the obturator nerve.

The adductor reflex is elicited by tapping over either the medial epicondyle of the femur or the medial condyle of the tibia, which should cause the adductor muscles of the hip to contract, moving the leg inwards.

The sign was described by John G Hannington-Kiff in 1980.

== See also ==
- Howship–Romberg sign
