= Loimologia =

1672 treatise by Dr. Nathaniel Hodges

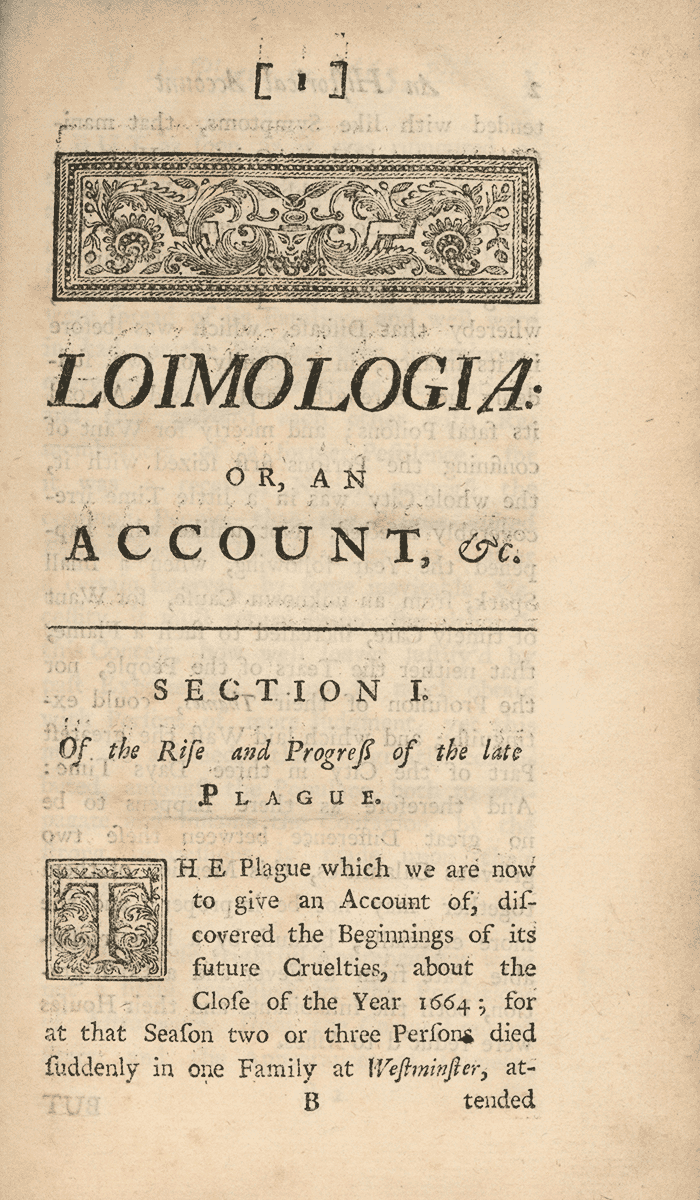
1720 English edition, page 1

Loimologia, or, an historical Account of the Plague in London in 1665, With precautionary Directions against the like Contagion is a treatise by Dr. Nathaniel Hodges (1629–1688), originally published in London in Latin (Loimologia, sive, Pestis nuperæ apud populum Londinensem grassantis narratio historica) in 1672; an English translation was later published in London in 1720. The treatise provides a first-hand account of the Great Plague of London; it has been described as the best medical record of the epidemic.

== Hodges' records of treatments ==
While most physicians fled the city, including the renowned Thomas Sydenham, and Sir Edward Alston, president of the Royal College of Physicians, Hodges was one of the few physicians who remained in the city during 1665, to record observations and test the effectiveness of treatments against the plague. The book also contains statistics on the victims in each parish.

== Additions in the 1720 edition ==
The English translation (1720) was released while a plague was spreading throughout Marseilles, and people in England were fearful of another disease outbreak. To this 1720 edition was added An essay on the different causes of pestilential diseases, and how they become contagious; with remarks on the infection now in France, and the most probable means to prevent its spreading here, by John Quincy.

== Impact ==
Loimologia was one of the sources used by Daniel Defoe when writing A Journal of the Plague Year (1722).

== Excerpts ==
Although the Soldiery retreated from the Field of Death, and encamped out of the City, the Contagion followed, and vanquish'd them; many in their Old Age, and others in their Prime, sunk under its cruelties; of the Female Sex most died; and hardly any children escaped; and it was not uncommon to see an Inheritance pass successively to three or four Heirs in as many Days; the Number of Sextons were not sufficient to bury the Dead.
