= Plague! The Musical =

- 2010 Production Poster
- Music: David Massingham, Matt Townend
- Lyrics: David Massingham, Matt Townend
- Book: David Massingham, Matt Townend
- Productions: 2008 Edinburgh Festival Fringe; 2010 Upstairs At The Gatehouse; 2010 Edinburgh Festival Fringe; 2013 Marble Valley Players, West Rutland, Vermont, USA; 2018 Theatrists Theatrics, Ithaca College, USA

Plague! The Musical is a musical with book, music and lyrics by David Massingham and Matthew Townend. It is a dark comedy based loosely on the events of the Great Plague of London in 1665–1666.

Plague premiered in 2008 at The Questors Theatre in Ealing, London before transferring to C venues at the Edinburgh Fringe Festival where it was named a 2008 sell out show. A new production was performed at the 2010 Edinburgh Fringe Festival. It was again performed at C venues with London previews at Upstairs at The Gatehouse.

Plague had its first U.S. debut in October 2013. Under the direction of Martin Bones, it was performed by the Marble Valley Players, in West Rutland, Vermont at the West Rutland Town Hall.

Under the student-direction of Will Giering, who also starred as The Beggar Lord in the U.S. debut, Plague was performed, again, by Ithaca College in November 2018.

== Synopsis ==
It is 1665 and Clive Hucklefish has come to London to start a career as an actor on the London stage. Mugged and left for dead within minutes of arrival (Oh London Town!), he finds himself being loaded onto a cart by Jerry Muldoon, assistant to destitute undertaker Phil Anbury. Realizing that Clive is not in fact dead, the initially disappointed Jerry escorts Clive to the local pub 'The Lousy Duck' and befriends him, introducing Clive to Milly, the pub's buxom barmaid and Jerry's sometime girlfriend.

Jerry explains the difficulties of making it to the London Stage, and tells Clive his story of how he became involved with undertaking. Clive agrees to join the undertakers to help revive their failing business (I've Got It Made!). Anbury appears and welcomes Clive aboard. Jerry celebrates by showing Clive how to win the attentions of the local women, but Clive foolishly targets the haughty Isabella, who rejects his advances. Anbury's hated rival, the Alchemist (who is also Isabella's father), with which he has a longtime feud, then enters. The two become embroiled in an insult duel that sees Anbury victorious.

The Alchemist returns home, and a confrontation with his daughter, who berates him for his pointless feud with the undertaker, leads to Isabella's departure. Meanwhile, the Alchemist plots to ruin the undertakers forever by distilling the fabled elixir of life, creating immortality for everyone (The Elixir of Life).

Finding Isabella in the street, Clive, Milly, and Jerry are surrounded by the beggars of London, who are ultimately swayed by Clive's gullibility (Spend a Penny). Isabella is impressed by Clive's normality, in contrast to her father's strangeness, and the two fall in love (Never Felt Like This Before).

Clive completes his training and becomes a fully fledged undertaker (Coffin of Your Past), but the Undertaker's business is already suffering, and the pressure soon takes its toll on Clive's relationship with Isabella (as does his jealousy over her ex - the celebrity rat-catcher the Pied Piper). Alone and distraught, Clive is approached by a sinister duo with an offer he can't refuse - a pair of rats dressed in mafioso suits (The Rat King). Pushed into the river tied to a rock, he is led deep into the London sewers to meet the mysterious Rat King, who claims to be a visionary seeking racial harmony between man and rat (Man and Rat). He begs Clive to uncover the bones of a great martyr to rat-kind - Elman Squatcherd. In return, the Rat King promises that the business will prosper. Clive is swayed and returns to Jerry, who sadly reveals that after an argument with Anbury, he sent him to Sweden. With little time left until they must pay their rent, Clive and Jerry dig up the body and Clive delivers the exhumed remains to the sewer.

Unbeknownst to Clive, however, Elman Squatcherd was the last known victim of the Black Death and the Rat King actually intends to use the remains to infect London with the deadly bubonic plague. His henchmen swap the deadly serum with the Elixir of life to ensure that salvation is impossible. The Alchemist unknowingly pours the serum into the London well.

Weeks later, citizens of London are dying at every turn, and the undertaking business is thriving. (It's Bubonic!)

The Londoners quickly assemble at the town hall looking for leadership but, without a cure, the devious Lord Mayor can only appease the mob with a scapegoat. The Londoners all debate whom to blame until the Alchemist arrives. Upon revealing he poured the “elixir of life” in the well, the townspeople realize that's what's causing the plague and blame him for starting it (Someone to Blame).

While counting their money, Clive and Jerry are visited by Milly, who confronts Clive about his wealth and his falling out with Isabella. Then Death arrives and demands to talk to Clive face to face. Death, who is revealed to be a woman, informs Clive that the recent outbreak has overworked her, and that he must end the plague or face the consequences. After Death leaves, Isabella and her father arrive to hide from the mob. Isabella, who isn't feeling well, goes to lie down. Clive soon realises that the rats must be behind everything. The Alchemist, upon hearing this, reveals that the whole thing is his fault; long ago, his experimentation on the rats had caused them to evolve and prosper, and when they became too demanding, he flushed them into the sewer. He then tells Clive there is only one who can help stop the rats: Isabella's ex-boyfriend, the Pied Piper.

Clive makes his way to the pub, where he finds the Pied Piper. Upon informing him that the rats are responsible for the plague, the Piper resolves to take the action to stop them. (Pay the Piper) However, the Rat King has already anticipated the move and kills the Piper with a booby-trapped sewer explosion. The Rat King then ambushes Clive, Jerry and Milly, tying them up and informing them that the age of rat has begun, and that rats will take the humans place in London once they are gone. All seems lost but, thanks to the timely assistance of the beggars, the heroes escape. Clive confronts the Rat King on London Bridge, and the Rat King, after revealing Isabella has caught the plague, throws the stolen Elixir of life into the Thames. Just as he has Clive cornered, the Undertaker (who has returned from exile as a new Pied Piper), arrives and saves him.

Clive returns to Isabella, and there are but a few precious moments before she passes away in his arms (You're Here). Death appears to collect her prize but, instead, informs Clive that the Elixir has spread throughout the water system and that the plague has, against all odds, been cured. As a reward for his endeavour, she agrees to grant Isabella a reprieve.

All London celebrates the end of the disaster (So the Plague Was Cured). Clive and Isabella are re-united, the Alchemist and the Undertaker put aside their differences (it transpires they are actually brothers and have been engaged in a lifelong brotherly feud), and even Death seems content, allowing herself to be wooed by the ever-daring Jerry. It is the indefatigable Rat King who has the last laugh, however, for he has just begun the next London-wide calamity by starting a small fire in a certain Pudding Lane, the subsequent year's calamity of 1666 known as the Great Fire of London.

== Song list ==
- Oh London Town
- I've Got It Made
- The Elixir Of Life
- Spend A Penny
- Never Felt Like This Before
- Coffin Of Your Past
- Just Two Days
- The Rat King
- Man and Rat
- It's Bubonic
- Someone To Blame
- Pay The Piper
- You're Here / So The Plague Was Cured

== Response ==
=== Critical reception ===
Plague! was generally well received with the British Theatre Guide calling it "an astoundingly good production" and What's On Stage calling it "one of the most ridiculous, outrageous, over the top and watchable pieces of musical theatre in a long time". The Herald called it "infectiously silly late night fun" while The Stage commented "this is what you come to the fringe for". Other positive reviews were found in View From The Stalls, The Groggy Squirrel and BBC Beds, Herts and Bucks.

There also were some notable poor reviews with Broadway Baby branding Plague! "a mild rash" and Fest Magazine commenting that Plague! was an "anarchic subversion of the musical tradition" imitated from the Rocky Horror Show. Hairline commented that although Plague is a "good idea with nice enjoyable sections" that "more thought and work is needed to produce a musical that can play to a Fringe audience for such a long period and keep them engaged and enthralled".

Plague! The Musical was awarded 2008 sell-out show status. It was also named a Mervyn Stutter 'Pick Of The Fringe'.

== US debut ==
Plague! The Musical opened for the first time to US audiences on 18 October 2013 for a four show run. Performed by the Marble Valley Players, Vermont's oldest, continuously operating community theater group, it debuted at the West Rutland Town Hall Theater in West Rutland, Vermont. During the second show, the cast and crew were treated to a surprise visit by the writers, David Massingham and Matthew Townend.

Under the direction of Martin Bones, two of the shows sold-out. The musical direction was led by Gary Schmidt, and Erika Schmidt directed the choreography.

On 9 and 10 November 2018, the show was performed at Ithaca College by “Theatrists Theatrics”— a student-run theatre group. It was the first college production done of the show.

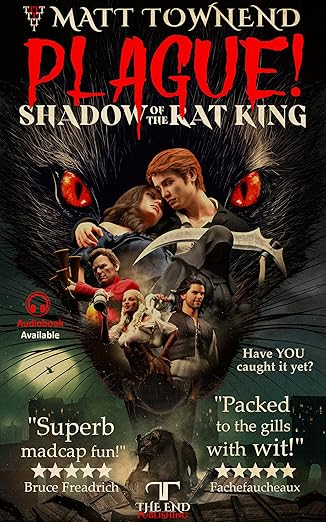
Plague! Shadow of the Rat King 2025 cover, the novelisation of Plague! The Musical

== Novelisation ==
In 2025, Plague! The Musical received a novelisation entitled Plague! Shadow of the Rat King written by one of the original authors of the musical Matthew Townend. The plot of the novel is identical to the musical but expanded, with the addition of more contemporary historical figures such as King Charles II, diarist Samuel Pepys, former spymaster John Thurloe, and actress Nell Gwyn. The author also cited the desire to make the novel more historically accurate than the musical, with locations such as Old London Bridge, Nonsuch House and the Tower of London featuring prominently. The author stated that he undertook a much higher degree of historical research for the novel that the authors of the musical had done previously. For example, the fictitious Mayor of London Sir Fisherprice the Lesser in the musical was replaced with the more historically accurate Bloodsworth in the novel. The author makes extensive use of footnotes and endnotes to explain away historical inaccuracies, make comic asides, comment upon the musical and original 2008 production, and add additional amusing historical anecdotes. Most of the songs were removed from the novelisation or adapted into dialogue, but It's Bubonic remains in keeping with the musical's central theme of dramatising and commercialising the sale of coffins; Pay the Piper remains, explained by the Pied Piper's ability to mesmerize a crowd into song; and You're Here is explained as a result of Isabella's fevered state.
