= John Quincy (medical writer) =

English apothecary (??–1722)

John Quincy (died 1722) was an English apothecary known as a medical writer.

== Life ==
He was apprenticed to an apothecary, and afterwards practised medicine as an apothecary in London. He was a Dissenter and a Whig, a friend of Dr. Richard Mead, and an enemy of Dr. John Woodward. He studied mathematics and the philosophy of Isaac Newton. He died in 1722.

== Works ==
He knew little of clinical medicine, and was only skilful in the arrangement of drugs in prescriptions. He considered dried millipedes good for tuberculous lymphatic glands, but thought the royal touch for scrofula superstitious. He received the degree of M.D. from the University of Edinburgh for his ‘Medicina Statica Britannica’ (1712), a translation of the ‘Aphorisms’ of Sanctorius, of which a second edition appeared in 1720. Joseph Collet, governor of Fort St. George, was one of his patrons, and Quincy printed in 1713 a laudatory poem on their common friend, the Rev. Joseph Stennett.

He published in 1717 a ‘Lexicon Physico-medicum,’ dedicated to John Montagu, 2nd Duke of Montagu, who had just been admitted a fellow of the Royal College of Physicians of London. It is based on the medical lexicon of Bartolomeo Castelli of Messina (died 1607), published at Basel in 1628, and went through eleven editions, of which the last two appeared respectively in 1794 and 1811 (greatly revised). His ‘English Dispensatory’ (1721), of which a fourth edition appeared in 1722 and a twelfth in 1749, contains a complete account of the materia medica and of therapeutics, and many of the prescriptions contained in it were popular.

In 1719 he published a scurrilous ‘Examination’ of John Woodward's ‘State of Physick and Diseases.’ A reply, entitled ‘An Account of Dr. Quincy's Examination, by N. N. of the Middle Temple,’ speaks of him as a bankrupt apothecary, a charge to which he made no reply in the second edition of his ‘Examination’ published, with a further ‘letter to Dr. Woodward,’ in 1720. In the same year he published an edition of the Loimologia of Nathaniel Hodges, and a collection of ‘Medico-physical Essays’ on ague, fevers, gout, leprosy, king's evil, and other diseases. In 1723 his ‘Prælectiones Pharmaceuticæ,’ lectures which had been delivered at his own house, were published with a preface by Dr. Peter Shaw.

- Pharmacopoeia officinalis et extemporanea : or a compleat English dispensatory in four parts . Bell, London 2nd. ed., very much improved 1719 Digital edition by the University and State Library Düsseldorf
