= Laparoscopic hiatal hernia repair =

Medical procedure

Laparoscopy
- Illustration of Laparoscopy
- ICD-9-CM: 54.9

Laparoscopic hernia repair is the repair of a hiatal hernia using a laparoscope, which is a tiny telescope-like instrument. A hiatal hernia is the protrusion of an organ through its wall or cavity. There are several different methods that can be used when performing this procedure. Among them are the Nissen Fundoplication and the general laparoscopic hernia repair.

== Types of Hiatal Hernias ==
There are two types of hiatal hernias. The two different types of hiatal hernias that are relevant to this surgery are rolling hiatal hernias and sliding hiatal hernias. A type II, rolling hiatal hernia, is when the gastric fundus is herniated, but the cardia portion of the stomach remains still. A type 1, or sliding hiatal hernia, is when the gastroesophageal junction and the cardia portion of the stomach move through the posterior mediastinum.

== Indications and Contraindications for Surgery ==
=== Indications ===
- Continuous symptoms after maximum medical management (changes in diet, weight loss, proton-pump inhibitors, H2 blockers, sucralfate)
- Recurrent aspiration pneumonia
- Asthma due to reflux
- Symptomatic hiatal hernias in young, healthy patients (<60 years old) who do not wish to be on lifelong medication
- Asymptomatic, very large hiatal hernias
- Gastric volvulus (surgical emergency)

=== Contraindications ===
==== Absolute ====
- Patient is unable to undergo general anesthesia
- Patient has an uncorrectable bleeding disorder

==== Relative ====
- Patient has a history of prior upper abdominal surgery
- Patient is morbidly obese (BMI >35)
- Severe esophageal motility disorder

== Methods ==
There are several different methods when performing a laparoscopic hernia repair. A few of these are the fundoplication and the general laparoscopic hernia repair.

In bariatric surgery, hernias are repaired laparoscopically anteriorly, rather than posteriorly as in the fundoplication procedure. This general laparoscopic procedure was introduced by Sami Salem Ahmad from Germany. The Nissen fundoplication procedure was first performed by Rudolph Nissen in 1955.

=== Laparoscopic hiatal hernia repair ===
A laparoscopic hiatal hernia repair is when the hiatal hernia is corrected using port sites, minimizing the incisions needed and quickening patient recovery. Usually, 5 ports are placed using trocars, and the patient is subsequently positioned at 25-30° reverse trendelenburg (also known as head up and feet down). The surgeon now separates the right crus from the esophagus, looping around to the left crus to separate it from the esophagus too. It is important to be careful to preserve the anterior and posterior vagus nerves. A Penrose drain is then placed around the esophagus for retraction and manipulation to allow the surgeon the best view possible. The gastric fundus is now separated from the short gastric arteries if the surgeon plans on doing a fundoplication. The surgeon now dissects the esophagus up into the mediastinum, being careful not to injure the pleura. These steps allow for the esophagus to become mobile. The esophagus is then pulled partially down into the abdominal cavity, ensuring that at least 3 cm of esophagus above the gastroesophageal junction (where the esophagus meets the stomach) is inside the abdominal cavity below the hiatus. Finally, the new hiatus is formed by closing the crural defect using sutures and ensuring a snug fit that is still loose enough to allow for the passage of food.

The surgeon may choose to use mesh to reinforce the new hiatus. Although mesh is commonly used, the Society of American Gastrointestinal and Endoscopic Surgeons guidelines state that they are uncertain of mesh usage in hiatal hernia repairs.

=== Nissen fundoplication ===
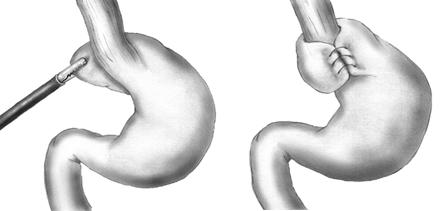
Illustration showing a Nissen fundoplication

After the steps of the laparoscopic hiatal hernia repair as outlined above, the Nissen fundoplication may be performed. The Nissen fundoplication is a 360° posterior (meaning behind) wrap. To start, a French bougie is passed from the mouth into the stomach to ensure that the wrap is not made too tight. The posterior (back) part of the gastric fundus is then brought behind the esophagus to the right side. While holding this part of the fundus in place, the anterior (front) part of the fundus is passed in front of the esophagus to meet the posterior portion on the right side. The surgeon then places 3-4 sutures through the posterior fundus, esophagus, and anterior mucosa to form the wrap and fix it into place. The final step is to suture the fundoplication to the new hiatus for extra security. The bougie can now be removed and the small incision sites can be closed.

=== Partial fundoplications ===
Partial fundoplications are often preferred over a Nissen fundoplication when patients have esophageal motility disorders, such as achalasia. A partial wrap theoretically allows for more esophageal movement, decreasing the likelihood of difficulty with swallowing after surgery. Two techniques are the Toupet fundoplication and the Dor fundoplication.

The Toupet fundoplication is a 270° posterior wrap that is performed similarly to the Nissen fundoplication. After repairing the hernia as outlined above, the surgeon passes the posterior fundus behind the esophagus to the right side. They then do a "shoeshine" maneuver, shimmying the fundus back and forth behind the esophagus until the placement is correct. The edge of the posterior fundus is now sutured to the esophagus and right crura at the 10 o'clock position, and the other side is sutured to the esophagus and left crura in the 2 o'clock position.

The Dor fundoplication is a 180° anterior wrap. Rather than passing the posterior fundus behind the esophagus, the surgeon passes the upper part of the greater curvature of the stomach in front of the esophagus. The fundus is then sutured to both the esophagus and hiatus, anchoring the wrap in place.

== Complications ==
When performing a laparoscopic hernia repair, patients undergoing the procedure face complications such as postoperative urinary retention (PUR). Another potential complication is requiring a second hernia repair after previously having one at an earlier time. Some complications can arise from the need for general anesthesia in having an open ventral hernia repair. Inherent risks are associated with the use of anesthesia.

General complications that can occur using any method of hernia repair are:

- problems with anesthesia dosage
- difficulty swallowing because the stomach is too high up or esophagus is wrapped too tightly
- heartburn
- excessive gas
- infection or bleeding
- esophagus moving out of wrap causing lower esophageal sphincter to not be supported

=== General laparoscopic procedure ===
Some complications that can arise from the general laparoscopic procedure are PUR (postoperative urinary retention)

Other complications that can arise during this procedure are:

- nerve injury that results in prolonged pain
- recurrence of hernia
- hematomas
- excessive bleeding that leads to the switch to open hernia repair
- wound infection

=== Nissen fundoplication procedure ===
Complications that can arise form this procedure are:

- dysphagia
- bloating
- other gastrointestinal symptoms

Overall, the complication rate for this procedure is about 10% to 20%. The failure rate, or inability to repair the hernia, is approximately 5%.

== Outcomes ==
The outcomes of laparoscopic hernia repair versus open hernia repair support laparoscopic hernia repair as the method of choice. Outcomes from having laparoscopic hernia repair are:

- A lower morbidity rate
- Low mortality rate
- Quarter inch to half an inch incisions that result in three small scars

A laparoscopic hiatal hernia repair results in a hospital stay of approximately 36 to 48 hours after the procedure has been performed

== Benefits ==
Laparoscopic hernia repair has several benefits compared to performing Open hernia repairs.

Benefits are:

- Three small scars at the point of incision compared to one large scar
- Reduced post-operative pain
- Shorter recovery time
- Shorter hospital stay

== See also ==
- Hiatus hernia
