= Nathaniel Hodges =

English physician

Nathaniel Hodges M.D. (14 September 1629–10 June 1688) was an English physician, known for his work during the Great Plague of London and his written account Loimologia of it.

== Early life ==
The son of Dr. Thomas Hodges, vicar of Kensington, he was born there on 14 September 1629. A king's scholar of Westminster School, he obtained a scholarship at Trinity College, Cambridge, in 1646. In 1648 he migrated to Oxford, and was appointed by the parliamentary visitors a student of Christ Church where he graduated B.A. 1651, M.A. 1654, and M.D. 1659. While there he took part in the activities of the Oxford Experimental Philosophy Club.

Hodges took a house in Walbrook, London, and began practice there. He was admitted a candidate or member of the College of Physicians 30 September 1659.

== The plague time ==
When the bubonic plague raged in London in 1665, Hodges remained in residence, and attended all who sought his advice. During the Christmas holidays of 1664–5 he saw a few doubtful cases, and in May and June several certain cases; in August and September as many as he could see by working hard all day. He rose early, and took a dose of anti-pestilential electuary as large as a nutmeg. After transacting his household affairs he entered his consulting room. Crowds of patients were always waiting, and for three hours he examined them and prescribed, finding some who were already ill, and others only affected by fear. When he had seen all he breakfasted, and visited patients at their houses. On entering a house he had a disinfectant burnt on hot coals, and if hot or out of breath rested till at his ease, then put a lozenge in his mouth and proceeded to examine the patient.

After spending some hours in this way, he returned home and drank a glass of sack, dining soon after, usually off roast meat with pickles or other relish. He drank more wine at dinner. Afterwards he saw patients at his own house, and paid more visits, returning home between eight and nine o'clock. He spent the evening at home, never smoking, but drinking old sack till he felt thoroughly cheerful. After this he generally slept well.

Twice during the epidemic he felt as if the plague had infected him, but after increased draughts of sack he felt well in a few hours, and he escaped without serious illness. In recognition of his services to the citizens during the plague, the authorities of the city granted him a stipend as their authorised physician.

== Later life ==
The College of Physicians recognised the merit of his book, and elected him a fellow 2 April 1672. In 1682 he was censor, and in 1683 delivered the Harveian oration (not printed). When censor he gave the college a fire-engine. His practice did not continue to increase, he became poor, was imprisoned in Ludgate Prison for debt, and there died 10 June 1688 aged 58. He was buried in St Stephen's, Walbrook, and a bust and inscription were to be seen there.

== Works ==
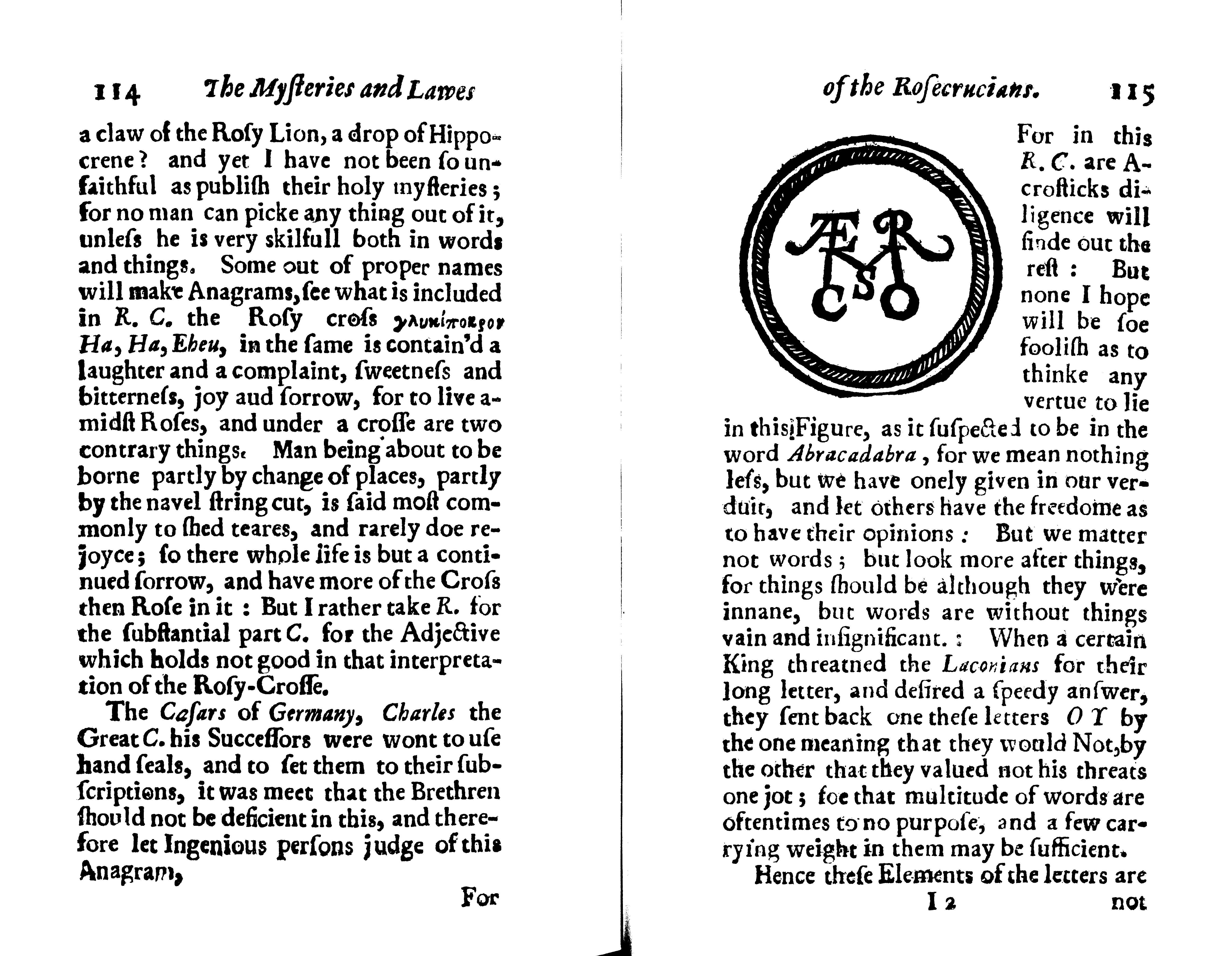
Pages from the 1656 translation of Aurea Themis of Michael Maier.

He was a contributor to the Oxford volume of verse issued in 1654 to celebrate the peace with the Dutch.

In 1666, he published an attack on quacks, ‘Vindiciæ Medicinæ et Medicorum, an Apology for the Profession and Professors of Physic.’ The 1656 translation of the Aurea Themis of Michael Maier was by Nathaniel Hodges and Thomas Hodges (his father or his brother).

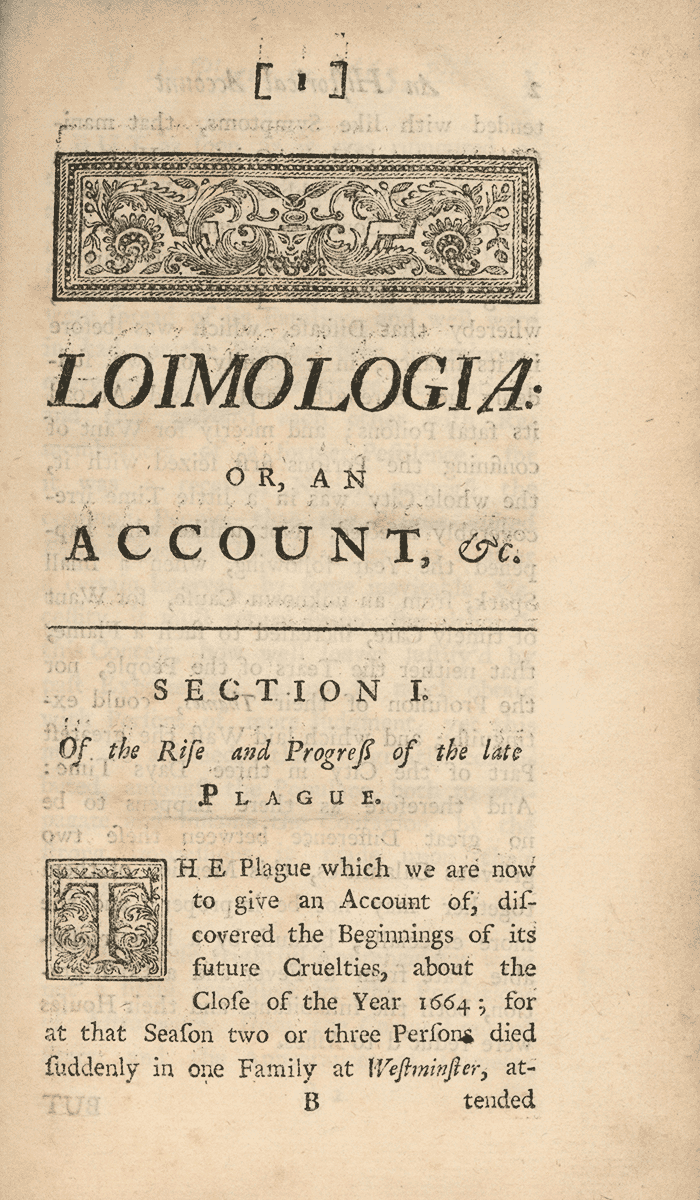
Loimologia, the 1720 translation.

In 1671, he completed an account of the plague, which was published in 1672 as Loimologia, sive Pestis nuperæ apud Populum Londinensem grassantis Narratio Historica. Hodges was an observer both of symptoms and the results of treatment. Bezoar, unicorn's horn, and dried toads he tried and found useless, but he recognised the merit of serpentary as a diaphoretic, and of hartshorn as a cardiac stimulant. He described pericarditis in a case of plague. A translation of Loimologia by Dr. John Quincy was published in 1720.
