= Kiff Gallagher =

American singer-songwriter

Christopher "Kiff" Gallagher is an American musician, songwriter, and nonprofit administrator, noted for his work in public service.

In 1993, Gallagher helped to create AmeriCorps, then served as president of the Social Venture Network before leaving to pursue singing and songwriting. He was never signed to a label, so decided to return to his background in public service. In 2008, his idea for a public service music education initiative was endorsed by then president-elect Barack Obama and former Governor of Arkansas Mike Huckabee.

Gallagher subsequently became CEO and founder of the nonprofit Music National Service ("MNS"), which administers MusicianCorps, a program that recruits musicians to serve as music teachers. "MNS [initially] launched a domestic 'musical Peace Corps' called MusicianCorps in four cities – SF/Oakland Bay Area, Chicago, New Orleans and Seattle – where twenty MusicianCorps Fellows serve[d] full-time in public schools, parks and recreation centers, children’s and veteran's hospitals, public housing communities and elsewhere in return for a living stipend, health benefits and professional development."

A 2008 Aspen Institute "Ideas Fellow," he graduated in 1991 from Wesleyan University with honors from the College of Letters.
