= Howship–Romberg sign =

- Differential diagnosis: obturator hernia

The Howship–Romberg sign is inner thigh pain on internal rotation of the hip. It can be caused by an obturator hernia. It is named for John Howship and Moritz Heinrich Romberg.
