= Thomas Gumble =

Thomas Gumble, D.D. (died 1676) was an English clergyman and biographer.

== Life ==
Gumble, for some time vicar of Chipping Wycombe, Buckinghamshire was appointed chaplain to George Monck, then in Scotland, at the end of 1655. Monck, finding him an excellent man of business, entrusted him with many commissions. On 4 January 1660 he was despatched from Newcastle-upon-Tyne to London with Monck's letters to the parliament and city. On his arrival (12 January) parliament ordered £100 to be given him, and recommended him (26 January) for the first vacant fellowship at Eton College.

In 1661 he was made D.D. of the University of Cambridge by royal mandate, and on 6 July of the same year was collated to the twelfth prebendal stall in Winchester Cathedral. He was also that year commissioned as Chaplain to Albemarle's Troop of the King's Life Guards. On 21 May 1663 he received the rectory of East Lavant, Sussex. Much to his regret, ill-health prevented him from performing his duty as chaplain of the Royal Charles during the conflict with the Dutch in February 1666. He died in 1676, apparently unmarried, for his estate was administered on 10 March 1676–7 by his brothers Stephen and John Gumble.

== Works ==
His only published work was a Life of General Monck, Duke of Albemarle, &c., with Remarks upon his Actions (London 1671). A French translation by Guy Miege (fr) was issued at London in 1672. Some copies of the translation have a second additional title-page, printed at Cologne in 1712, when the work was sold to advance the cause of the Old Pretender.
