= Volcanic winter of 536 =

Cooling period in Northern Hemisphere caused by volcanic eruptions

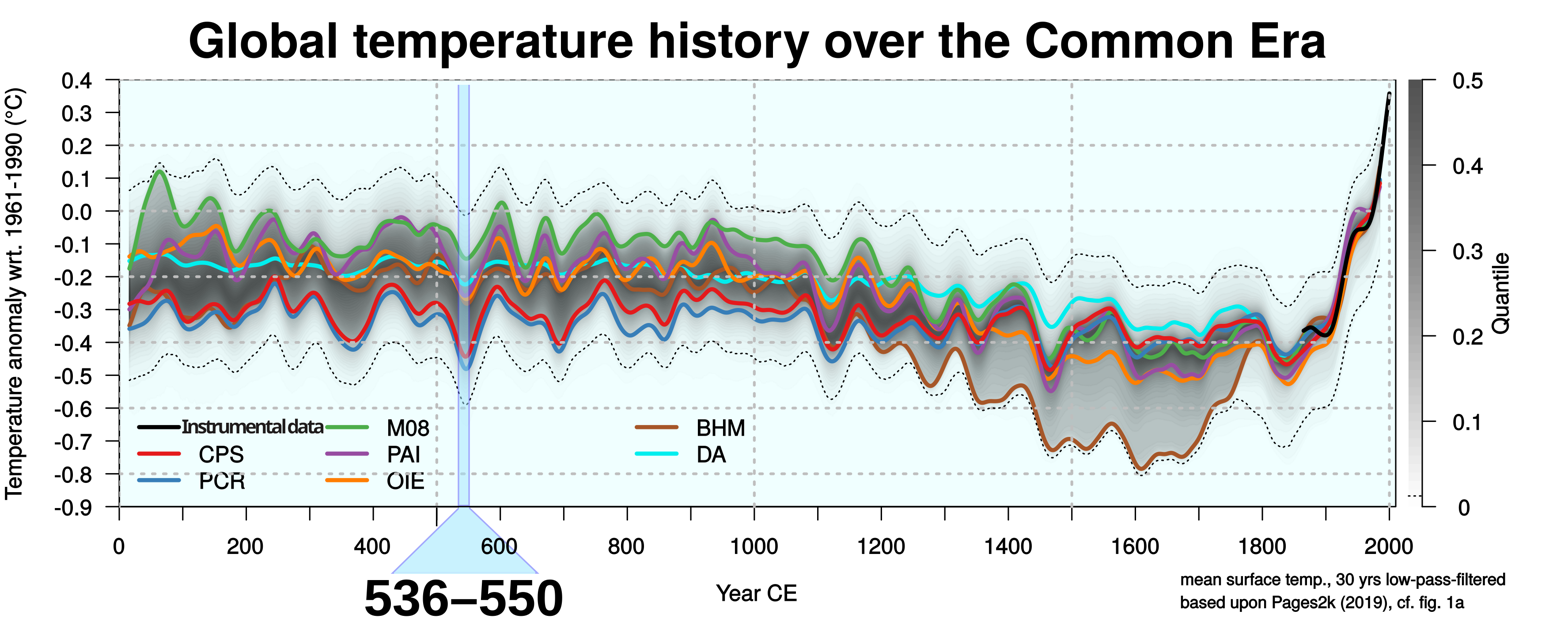
The climate anomaly 536–550 in the context of global recent temperatures

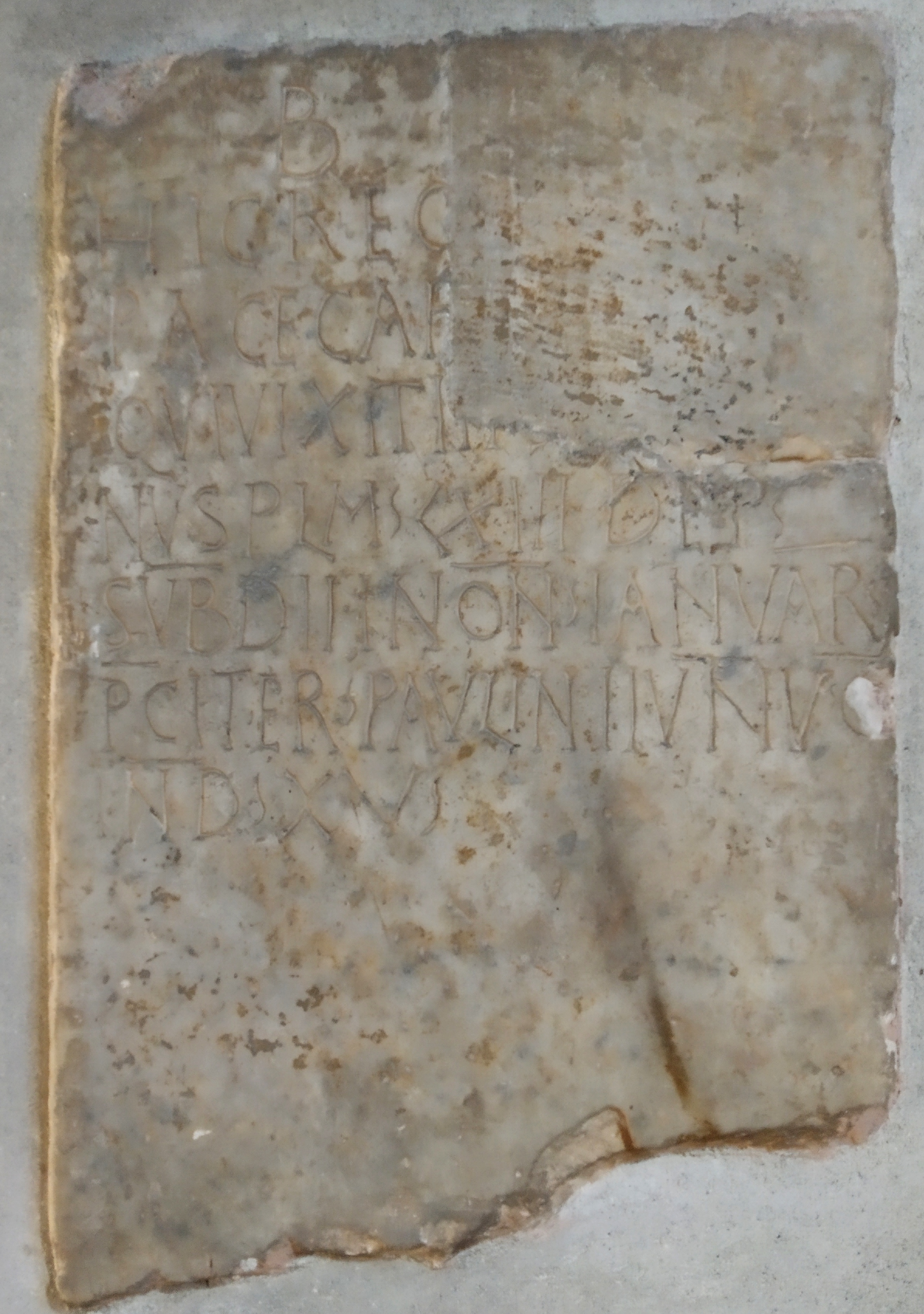
Tombstone in the chapel of Filippo e Giacomo, Nosedo, dated to AD 536 (the second year after the consulship of Decius Paulinus)

The volcanic winter of 536 was among the most severe and protracted episodes of climatic cooling in the Northern Hemisphere in the last two thousand years. The volcanic winter was caused by at least three eruptions of uncertain origin, with several possible locations proposed in various continents. In early AD 536 (or possibly late 535), an eruption ejected great amounts of sulfate aerosols into the atmosphere, reducing the solar radiation reaching the Earth's surface and cooling the atmosphere for several years. In March 536, Constantinople began experiencing darkened skies and lower temperatures.

Summer temperatures in 536 fell by as much as 2.5 °C (4.5 °F) below European normal. The lingering effect of the volcanic winter of 536 was augmented in the years 539 and 540, when another volcanic eruption caused summer temperatures to decline as much as 2.7 °C (4.9 °F) below European normal. There is evidence of still another volcanic eruption in 547 that would have extended the cool period. The volcanic eruptions caused crop failures, and were accompanied by the Plague of Justinian, famine, and millions of deaths and initiated the Late Antique Little Ice Age, which lasted from 536 to 660.

Historian Michael McCormick has called the year 536 "the beginning of one of the worst periods to be alive, if not the worst year."

== Documentary evidence ==
The Roman historian Procopius recorded in his AD 536 report on the wars with the Vandals: "during this year a most dread portent took place. For the sun gave forth its light without brightness... and it seemed exceedingly like the sun in eclipse, for the beams it shed were not clear".

In 538, the Roman statesman Cassiodorus described the following to one of his subordinates in letter 25:

- The sun's rays were weak, and they appeared a "bluish" colour.
- At noon, no shadows from people were visible on the ground.
- The heat from the sun was feeble.
- The moon, even when full, was "empty of splendour"
- "A winter without storms, a spring without mildness, and a summer without heat"
- Prolonged frost and unseasonable drought
- The seasons "seem to be all jumbled up together"
- The sky is described as "blended with alien elements" just like cloudy weather, except prolonged. It was "stretched like a hide across the sky" and prevented the "true colours" of the sun and moon from being seen, along with the sun's warmth.
- Frosts during harvest, which made apples harden and grapes sour.
- The need to use stored food to last through the situation.
- Subsequent letters (nos. 26 and 27) discuss plans to relieve a widespread famine.

In the entry corresponding to the year 535–536, the early 7th century Mandaean Book of Kings relates: "were you to request a tenth of a peck of grain in the land Gawkāy, (Note: The location of "the land Gawkāy" is unknown; since the reference is from a 6th century Mandaean text, it was likely a place in Mesopotamia or western Persia.) for five staters, we would look but it would not be found." In other words, if 873 grams of grain could not even be purchased for 43 grams of gold, then grain was extremely scarce.

Michael the Syrian (1126–1199), a patriarch of the Syriac Orthodox Church, reported that from 536 to 537 the sun shone feebly for a year and a half.

The Irish annals recorded the following:

- "A failure of bread in AD 536" – the Annals of Ulster
- "A failure of bread from AD 536–539" – the Annals of Inisfallen

The mid-10th-century Annales Cambriae record for the year 537:

- "The Battle of Camlann, in which Arthur and Medraut fell, and there was great mortality in Britain and Ireland." (Note: The battle is dated 539 in some editions.)

Chinese sources (Note: The Wei Shu was compiled during the Northern Qi dynasty, the Bei Shi and Nan Shi were compiled during the Tang dynasty, while Zizhi Tongjian was compiled during the Northern Song dynasty.) include:

- The Book of Wei, which mentions hailstorms across multiple commanderies in autumn 536.
- The Bei Shi (北史; History of the North), which mentions the "great cold" and "famine" that occurred in autumn 536. In the same year, a great famine in Guanzhong led to cannibalism and the death of 70-80% of the population.
- The Zizhi Tongjian, a historical text that mentions the "famine that occurred in the Guanzhong region that year."
- The Nan Shi (南史; History of the South), which describes "a yellow ash-like substance from the sky" in the winter of that year.

Further phenomena were reported by independent contemporary sources:

- Low temperatures, even snow during the summer (snow reportedly fell in August in China, which caused the harvest there to be delayed).
- Widespread crop failures.
- "A dense, dry fog" in the Middle East, China and Europe. (Note: See also: Vog)
- Drought in Peru, which affected the Moche culture.

There are other sources of evidence regarding this period.

== Scientific evidence ==
Tree ring analysis by the dendrochronologist Mike Baillie, of Queen's University Belfast, Northern Ireland, shows abnormally little growth in Irish oak in 536 and another sharp drop in 542, after a partial recovery. Ice cores from Greenland and Antarctica show evidence of substantial sulfate deposits in around 534 ± 2, which is evidence of an extensive acidic dust veil.

== Possible explanations ==
It was originally theorized that the climatic changes of AD 536 were caused by global dimming caused by increased atmospheric aerosols and particulates from either volcanic eruption plumes (a phenomenon known as "volcanic winter") or impact events by meteorite or comet (known as "impact winter").

In 2015, revision of polar ice core chronologies dated sulfate deposits and a cryptotephra layer to the year 536 (previously dated to 529 before revision). This is strong evidence that a large explosive volcanic eruption caused the observed global dimming and cooling. But Dallas Abbott and her colleagues found spherules containing nickel and copper in an ice core, giving support to an impact event around this time.

The source of a volcanic eruption remains to be found but several proposed volcanoes have been rejected:

- R. B. Stothers postulated the volcano Rabaul in New Britain, in Papua New Guinea. But the eruption is now thought to have occurred in the interval AD 667–699 based on wiggle-match radiocarbon dating.
- David Keys suggested the volcano Krakatoa by shifting a cataclysm in AD 416 recorded in the Javanese Book of Kings to 535. But drilling projects in the Sunda Strait ruled out any possibility that an eruption took place there during this time period.
- Robert Dull and colleagues proposed the Tierra Blanca Joven (TBJ) eruption of the Ilopango caldera, which was a high-end VEI-6. But identification of TBJ tephra in ice cores narrowed the eruption date to 429–433.
- Christopher Loveluck and his colleagues proposed Icelandic volcanos based on the shards from a Swiss glacier. However, the cryptotephras dated exactly to AD 536 are geochemically distinct from Icelandic tephra, and the shards in the Swiss glacier have a large age uncertainty.

Geochemical analysis of AD 536 cryptotephras distinguishes at least three synchronous eruptive events in North America. Further analysis correlates one of the eruptions to a widespread Mono Craters tephra identified in northeast California. The other two eruptions most likely originated from the eastern Aleutians and Northern Cordilleran volcanic province.

== Historic consequences ==
The 536 event and ensuing famine have been suggested as an explanation for the deposition of hoards of gold by Scandinavian elites at the end of the Migration Period. The gold was possibly a sacrifice to appease the gods and get the sunlight back. Mythological events such as the Fimbulwinter and Ragnarök are theorised to be based on the cultural memory of the event.

A book written by David Keys speculates that the climate changes contributed to various developments, such as the emergence of the Plague of Justinian (541–549), the decline of the Avars, the migration of Mongol tribes towards the west, the end of the Sasanian Empire, the collapse of the Gupta Empire, the rise of Islam, the expansion of Turkic tribes, and the fall of Teotihuacan. In 2000, a 3BM Television production (for WNET and Channel Four) capitalised upon Keys' book. The documentary, under the name Catastrophe! How the World Changed, was broadcast in the US as part of PBS's Secrets of the Dead series.

However, Keys's ideas lack mainstream acceptance. Reviewing his book, British archaeologist Ken Dark commented that "much of the apparent evidence presented in the book is highly debatable, based on poor sources or simply incorrect. . . . Nonetheless, both the global scope and the emphasis on the 6th century CE as a time of wide-ranging change are notable, and the book contains some obscure information that will be new to many. However, it fails to demonstrate its central thesis and does not offer a convincing explanation for the many changes discussed".

Philologist Andrew Breeze argues that some Arthurian events, including the Battle of Camlann, are historical, happening in 537 as a consequence of the famine associated with the climate change of the previous year.

Historian Robert Bruton argues that this catastrophe played a role in the decline of the Roman Empire.

== See also ==
- 1257 Samalas eruption
- 1452/1453 mystery eruption
- 1815 eruption of Mount Tambora, largest ever recorded
- 946 eruption of Paektu Mountain
- Fimbulwinter
- Great Famine of 1315–1317
- Justinian I, Roman emperor at the time
- Laki
- Minoan eruption
- Tierra Blanca Joven eruption
- Volcanism of Iceland
- Year Without a Summer, 1816
- Extreme event attribution
