= Unexplained volcanic eruption =

Volcanic event known through indirect evidence

An unexplained volcanic eruption is a major volcanic event known primarily through indirect evidence such as sulfate spikes in polar ice cores, tree ring anomalies, and historical climate impacts. They are sometimes referred to as mystery volcanic eruptions because the exact source of the material is unknown. Because evidence for them is indirect, precise details are unknown, but some of these events were later identified through further research.

These eruptions can have significant climate impacts by creating a volcanic winter event where material from the eruption decreases the amount of solar energy reaching the earth for a period. These global cooling episodes can have significant societal impacts. Many of these unexplained eruptions are believed to have occurred in remote tropical regions where there are limited historical records from the period as well as limited modern scientific data on many volcanoes.

== Detection and evidence ==
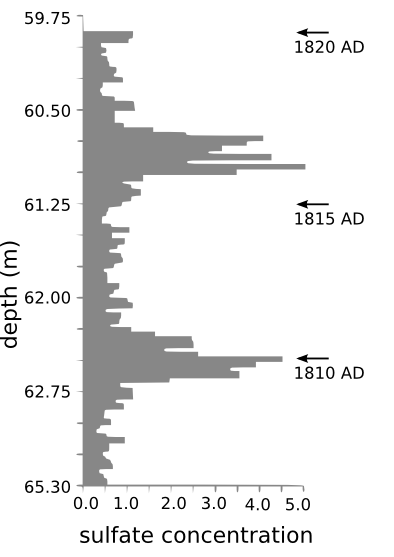
Sulfate concentrations in ice cores from Greenland showing a spike around 1810 from an unexplained eruption.

There are many global cooling events associated with volcanic eruptions. The 1815 eruption of Mount Tambora was one of these, leading to the Year Without a Summer in 1816. Other known global cooling events do not have a well-known source but evidence from ice cores in Antarctica and Greenland have led scientists to conclude that some were also caused by large volcanic eruptions. In some cases, global temperatures are estimated to have cooled by as much as 1 °C (1.8 °F).

Unexplained volcanic eruptions have to be quite large to produce global evidence. Most are generally believed to be in the tropics because large eruptions at low latitude are more capable of distributing tephra and emissions globally throughout the atmosphere.

For some of these eruptions, the global cooling event associated with such an eruption was known before evidence for it originating from a volcano was discovered. Cooling caused by the 1808 mystery eruption, for example, was believed to have been natural variation in the Little Ice Age before a sulfate spike was discovered in ice cores in the early-1990s.

After these eruptions are detected in ice cores they are often able to be corroborated with tree ring data, especially in long-living species such as bristlecone pines in the Western United States and high-latitude trees in Siberia and Finland. Additional insight can be gained from contemporary accounts of unusual atmospheric phenomena. These can sometimes narrow the geographic scope of the search for the relevant volcano.

A few of these eruptions were later pinned down to a specific volcano after their discovery as more evidence was discovered. The 1257 Samalas eruption is one of these. Evidence for it was discovered in ice cores in the 1980s but the exact source was not determined until the early-2010s as tree ring evidence from Japan and contemporary writings on palm leaves in Indonesia were explored. Another such event in 1831 was identified as originating from Zavaritski Caldera in what is now the Russian Far East.

== Notable eruptions ==
=== 19th century ===
A cooling period in 1809 has been linked to a sulfate spike in ice cores early in that year. It has been proposed that a series of eruptions occurred in 1808 to cause this, with possible sources in Antarctica, Indonesia, and Alaska. The amplitude of the cooling was similar to that observed in the 1816 Year Without a Summer caused by the VEI-7 eruption of Mount Tambora the year before.

Accounts from Francisco José de Caldas in Colombia and Hipólito Unanue in Peru described a dry fog in December 1808 that could have been sulfuric acid aerosols leading researchers to conclude the tropical eruption related to this cooling occurred within seven days of December 4, 1808 and narrowing down the geographic range to between Indonesia and South America. There are oral histories of volcanic eruptions from Polynesians and other nearby indigenous people around this time but none with the level of specificity needed to determine the origin of this eruption.

=== 15th century ===
There are two mystery eruptions from the 15th Century that led to the second pulse of the Little Ice Age which started in the 13th Century as a result of the 1257 Samalas eruption and another unexplained eruption. The event in 1452 or 1453 produced a stronger sulfate spike in Greenlandic ice cores compared to those in Antarctica, leading researchers to hypothesize that the eruption was in the low latitudes of the Northern Hemisphere. Crop failures were noted throughout the Northern Hemisphere and frost damage was evident on bristlecone pines in the Western United States during this time period.

The second eruption happened in 1458. This was originally also estimated to have occurred around 1452 but improved resolution in the ice core data led to the revision to 1458. This has the highest sulfate concentration in the last 700 years but the spike is stronger in Antarctica indicating the eruption was likely in the Southern Hemisphere. Theories for the origin include Kuwae, which is a former landmass near Tongoa that was destroyed by a volcanic eruption in the 15th Century and features in Tongoan folklore.

=== 6th century ===
A volcanic winter began in 536 that was reinforced by subsequent possible eruptions in 540 and 547. It is among the most significant cooling episodes in the Northern Hemisphere in the last 2,000 years and triggered the Late Antique Little Ice Age. In addition to ice cores, sediment cores were useful in narrowing down the time period to 536. Contemporary sources such as the Roman statesman Cassiodorus, Michael the Syrian, Irish annals, Chinese records, and others describe diminished sunlight and crop failures.

== Climate and societal impacts ==
One of the strongest signals for an unattributed volcanic eruption can be found in the climate record using ice cores, sediment cores, and tree ring data. The volcanic winter of 536 is the strongest of these with cooling of 2.5 °C (4.5 °F) described. The larger triggered longer-term cooling episodes lasting decades to centuries, often augmented by subsequent eruptions that may come from a mix of unknown and known sources.

Cooling of this magnitude has caused famines that are recorded in the historical record due to widespread crop failures. Contemporary records frequently mention issues such as a "failure of bread", decreased warmth from the sun, and persistent dry fog.

Historians have attributed these famines to broader societal upheavals with varying degrees of acceptance within the broader academic community. A book written by David Keys attempts to link the 536 event to the Plague of Justinian, the fall of the Gupta Empire, and the fall of Teotihuacan. These grander attributions have failed to gain mainstream recognition with archaeologist Ken Dark criticizing the quality of the evidence for all of these events while acknowledging the notability of changes in the world at the time.

The 1452/1453 event brought significant climatic changes just before the fall of Constantinople to the Ottoman Empire and may have played a role through decreased food supply and severe weather conditions.
