= Hallstatt plateau =

Flat area on graphs that plot radiocarbon dating

The Hallstatt plateau or the first millennium BC radiocarbon disaster, as it is called by some archaeologists and chronologists, is a term used in archaeology to refer to a consistently flat area on graphs that plot radiocarbon dating against calendar dates. The plateau is named after the Hallstatt culture period in central Europe that it coincides with. Radiocarbon dates of around 2450 BP, so c. 500 BC, always calibrate to c. 800–400 cal BC, no matter the measurement precision. The cause of this plateau in the diagram is a period of continuous change in the amount of radiocarbon in the atmosphere. In retrospect, this temporarily removes the baseline against which radiocarbon dates can be calibrated. The underlying cause of the change is not understood in detail as it involved interactions between what happened on the Sun and in the Earth's atmosphere. During the plateau, the calendar-date estimates obtained when calibrating single radiocarbon measurements are very broad and cover the entire duration of the plateau. Only techniques like wiggle matching can yield more precise calendar dates during this period.

== Wiggle matching ==
Wiggle matching involves taking a series of radiocarbon dates where the prior knowledge about the true calendar dates of the samples can be expressed as known differences in age between those samples, or occasionally as differences in age with some small uncertainty. The series of radiocarbon dates can then be matched to the calibration curve to provide a relatively precise estimate of age. When the results are plotted on a graph, the "wiggles" in the sample sequence of radiocarbon dates match the "wiggles" in the calibration curve—hence the name.

== Effect of the plateau ==
Peter James cites Mike Baillie (who developed Irish oak dendrochronology): "The immediate conclusion is that it is impossible to sensibly resolve the radiocarbon dates of any samples whose true ages lie between 400 and 800 BC. This is a catastrophe for Late Bronze Age/Iron Age archaeology although one which has been predicted for some time."

== See also ==
- Dating methodology (archaeology)
- Geologic time scale
