= David Keys =

British catastrophist

David Keys is an archeological correspondent and journalist. He has been archaeology correspondent for the London based daily paper, The Independent since 1986, as well as a writer on historical climate change, and contributor to television programs on archeological subjects.

His book Catastrophe: An Investigation into the Origins of the Modern World (2000) on a 6th-century AD climatic disaster has had a mixed reception – he and his theory were featured in the 2000 Television pilot to the PBS series, Secrets of the Dead.

== 6th Century catastrophe theory ==
Keys' book Catastrophe: An Investigation into the Origins of the Modern World (2000) theorizes that a natural disaster caused changes during the 6th and 7th centuries in the whole world, including Christian territories, that contributed to the end of ancient civilization and initiated what is now known as the medieval era. Key's work expands on that by Mike Baillie in Exodus to Arthur: catastrophic encounters with comets (1999) in which the primary evidence for the event is dendochronology (shown by narrow rings around c. 540 CE), as well as acidity in Greenlandic ice cores (suggesting volcanic activity), as well as accounts of historians such as John of Ephesus, Procopius, and Cassiodorus on changes in climate, including dimming of the sun. Keys adds further information from East Asia and develops his own version of the theory; he attributes the changes to a volcanic event in East Asia, in 535 AD, possible at Krakatoa.

=== Critical response ===
The work has received mixed reviews: Publishers Weekly criticized the book, writing that "Huge claims call for big proof, yet Keys reassembles history to fit his thesis, relentlessly overworking its explanatory power in a manner reminiscent of Velikovsky's theory that a comet collided with the earth in 1500 B.C."

A mainly critical review in The New York Times Book Review by Malcolm W. Browne concluded that "Still, this book must be taken seriously, if only as a reminder that survival in a world threatened by real dangers hangs by a very slender thread".

British archaeologist Ken Dark commented that "much of the apparent evidence presented in the book is highly debatable, based on poor sources or simply incorrect. [...] Nonetheless, both the global scope and the emphasis on the 6th century AD as a time of wide-ranging change are notable, and the book contains some obscure information which will be new to many. However, it fails to demonstrate its central thesis and does not offer a convincing explanation for the many changes discussed". Archaeologist Brian M. Fagan referred to it as "investigative journalism" and "an interesting and, at times, compelling narrative (and good television)" concluding that "Keys is right to draw attention to the importance of short-term climatic change, but, in our present state of knowledge, the deterministic and somewhat sensationally written Catastrophe goes too far."

== British monarchy ==
Keys has warned against the United Kingdom becoming a republic. In an Independent article published a few days after the coronation of Charles III and Camilla, he wrote: "In most examples of the abolition of monarchies in major countries, their demise was followed by a strengthening of the right and the erosion of democracy, justice, equality and liberty."

== See also ==
- Extreme weather events of 535–536
