= David Keys (disambiguation) =

David Keys may refer to:

- David Keys (musician) (born 1979), English theremin player
- David Keys (author), British archaeologist

== See also ==
- David M. Key (1824–1900), senator
