= 21st-century Madagascar plague outbreaks =

Outbreaks of plague in Madagascar during the 21st century

2014 Madagascar plague outbreak
- Date: 31 August 2014– 11 February 2015
- Location: Madagascar
- Cause: Bubonic and pneumonic plague
- Outcome: 263 confirmed cases
- Deaths: 71 (27% fatality rate)
- as of 11 February 2015

Madagascar has experienced several outbreaks of bubonic and pneumonic plague in the 21st century. In the outbreak beginning in 2014, 71 died; in 2017, 202 died. Smaller outbreaks occurred in January 2008 (18 deaths), and December 2013.

2017 Madagascar plague outbreak
- Date: 27 August 2017 – early 2018
- Location: Madagascar
- Cause: Bubonic and pneumonic plague
- Outcome: 2575 (suspected, probable, confirmed cases)
- Deaths: 221 (8.6% case fatality rate)
- as of 15 December 2017

== History ==
=== 2014 ===
An outbreak of plague in Madagascar in 2014 started on 31 August. On that day the first case, a man from Soamahamanina village in Tsiroanomandidy, was identified. The patient died on 3 September. The outbreak was in the form of bubonic and pneumonic plague. By 16 November 2014, a total of 119 cases had been confirmed, including 40 deaths. Two percent of reported cases were of the pneumonic form. By 21 November, in the capital Antananarivo there were two confirmed cases, including one death.

On 4 November 2014, the Ministry of Health of Madagascar reported the outbreak to the World Health Organization.

On 11 February 2015, the WHO and Madagascar Ministry of Health released a follow-up situation report the outbreak. The report stated the outbreak beginning in September 2014 peaked from November through end-December and had slowed down as of February 2015. The WHO report cited 263 cases and 71 deaths with a 27% fatality rate. Efficient identification and treatment with antibiotics were noted as critical to treatment efficacy, evidenced by fatality rates ranging from 15% - 60% depending on early identification and treatment. The report explained that Madagascar's plague "season" typically runs through April and stopped short of officially declaring the outbreak over.

=== 2017 ===
A more recent outbreak of plague in Madagascar began in August 2017 and expanded rapidly, with about two-thirds of cases transmitted person-to-person as pneumonic plague, the most dangerous form of the disease. More than half of cases have been recorded in the capital of Antananarivo and the main port of Toamasina, the largest cities in Madagascar. Nine nearby countries were considered at high risk of a similar outbreak. The outbreak appeared to peak in mid-October with the number of new cases declining. Typically the annual plague outbreak peaks in December and runs until April.

On 2 November, a ProMED-mail moderator expressed surprise at the considerable variation reported in numbers of cases and deaths, especially with the relatively low case-fatality rate considering that pneumonic plague is reported to account for over 60 percent of deaths. An article from the World Health Organization reported more than 1800 cases as of late October, while nearly 500 fewer had been reported in the week previously.

In January 2018 the experts declared the outbreak over as no new cases had been reported since November 2017, although the World health organization stated that there was a "moderate" chance of re-occurrence. Malagasy Prime Minister Olivier Mahafaly Solonandrasana had declared the crisis over on 23 November 2017.

==== August ====
The outbreak began in August 2017 with the death from pneumonic plague of a 31-year-old man who had been traveling in a crowded minibus toward the capital city of Antananarivo in the central highlands. The outbreak expanded rapidly, transmitted person-to-person in the pneumonic form of the disease, which accounted for more than 60 percent of cases. Scientists discovered three new strains of Y. pestis in Madagascar in 2017. Additionally, one strain of Y. pestis was found to be resistant to antibiotic treatment. Because of plague moving from rural to urban areas, there is increased risk of transmission to other countries. Urban areas that are major transportation hubs for shipping and recreation are at high risk for transmitting plague to nearby countries.

==== September–October ====
The outbreak was initially recognized on 11 September by local authorities and confirmed by the Institut Pasteur de Madagascar. Authorities called the outbreak "quite worrisome" because the number of cases per day was growing rapidly, and many cases were in urban areas where there are more opportunities for contact between people. Panic was reported in the capital, with the main hospital overcrowded with cases. The death toll in this outbreak had by mid-October exceeded the 2014 outbreak. Most cases were of the pneumonic form. The bubonic form, transmitted by the bites of fleas from rodents, is more usual in the annual outbreaks in Madagascar. The government announced they had "temporarily suspended gatherings to the general public in places where the traceability of the participants is difficult if not impossible (stadiums, sports palaces, gymnasiums ...)".

==== November ====
By 8 November, deaths had risen to 165 with infections totalling over 2000, however the rate of spread had slowed, raising hope that the outbreak was starting to come under control. Concerns continued to be raised that plague might still spread to neighboring countries, or mutate to a form that could be more difficult to treat. By 15 November, there had been 171 deaths and 2119 total cases of plague, however no new infections had been reported since 28 October.

== Background ==
Plague is caused by the bacterium Yersinia pestis and is most commonly transmitted through infected fleas. There are three types of plague: bubonic, pneumonic and septicemic. Bubonic plague is the most well-known type. This type of plague results in swollen lymph nodes that are called buboes. This type of plague is treatable with antibiotics, but if not treated effectively, the infection can spread to different parts of the body. Pneumonic plague occurs when plague infects the lungs and is transmissible person to person through infected droplets. This form of plague is very deadly. Septicemic plague occurs when plague enters the blood. Skin and tissues turn black and die, and bleeding into skin and organs often occurs. This form of plague is also deadly. Pneumonic plague and septicemic plague often occur when bubonic plague goes untreated and are difficult to diagnose.

=== Endemic plague ===
Plague has endemically resided in Madagascar since it was first brought to the island from India in 1898, on the central high plateau of Madagascar, usually occurring every year as a seasonal upsurge during the rainy season. Plague resides in Madagascar similar to the way flu resides in the United States. "Plague season" is generally October through March, and mostly affects rural areas of Madagascar. Plague, although endemic, has been relatively dormant in Madagascar until 1990. Annually until then, there were about 20-30 cases reported a year. Recently, however, the annual number of cases has risen to typically between 800 and 1500 a year. All cases of plague must be reported to the Ministry of Health; however, cases often go underreported due to lack of quality epidemiologic resources in rural areas. Tests for plague used in these areas often have low sensitivity and are unreliable. In the past, cases of plague in Madagascar have been bubonic and not transmittable person to person. The increase in plague cases over the last 20 years have been largely due to an increase in pneumonic plague. Pneumonic plague is transmitted person to person via infected droplets. It is often difficult to diagnose and by the time it is diagnosed, cases are usually fatal. Case fatality rate of pneumonic plague in Madagascar is close to 75%.

=== Confounding factors ===
==== Rural to urban ====
When an endemic disease, such as Ebola or plague, is introduced to a new geographic area that is densely populated with international shipping routes, it increases transmission rates and leads to severe outbreaks and potential pandemics. Although urban areas like Antananarivo and Mahajanga are more affluent, they are still impoverished in global comparison. Insufficient waste management, lack of clean water, and poor infrastructure are all issues that are breeding grounds for rats and fleas and therefore perpetuate plague transmission in urban areas. Furthermore, the rat-to-flea cycle of transmission has not changed since the first pandemic of plague. This type of consistency allows the organism to become more infectious.

==== Rats and fleas ====
High rates of plague transmission have been associated with low rat abundance and high volume of flea vectors. Historically, rats who acted as hosts to the flea vector subsequently died once they were infected with plague. However, the organism evolved and scientists are now finding that rats are not dying from plague. This means that plague survives longer in the host and allows for the bacteria to live longer and potentially infect more people. The elevation of the mountains where most of the agriculture takes place, in addition to the ideal climate that allows rats and fleas to prosper, scientists have seen plague thrive in Madagascar's climate compared to other countries where there is endemic plague.

==== Evolution of bacteria ====
Scientists discovered three new strains of Y. pestis in Madagascar in 2017. Additionally, one strain of Y. pestis was found to be resistant to antibiotic treatment. Because of plague moving from rural to urban areas, there is increased risk for transmission to other countries. Urban areas that are a major transportation hub for shipping and recreation are at high risk for transmitting plague to nearby countries.

==== Agriculture ====
Plague in Madagascar is predominantly a rural disease related to agricultural activities. Plague "season" (October through April) coincides with the hot and rainy season in the agricultural highlands. Rats do not thrive in cold climate, and therefore are more prevalent during this time of year. Rice is a vital crop in Madagascar, and due to the high prevalence of fleas and rats in agricultural areas, plague bacteria often infects crops and soil. Many scientists have found that the plague bacteria Y. pestis can live in soil for months at a time.

==== Burial practices ====
In addition to agricultural factors that increase prevalence of plague, burial practices in Madagascar also spread disease. Famadihana is a burial practice in Madagascar that is practiced among the Malagasy people. It is commonly known as "turning of the bones". Family members exhume their deceased family members from the family crypts and wrap them up in fresh cloth. Then, they dance around the crypt with the body to live music. This custom is based on a belief that the dead do not join the rest of their ancestors until their body reaches full decomposition with appropriate ceremonies. This process could take up to several years and involves direct contact with corpses. This burial practice perpetuates the spread of plague among other diseases.

==== Poverty ====
Plague is symptomatic of poverty. Rats and fleas thrive in rural and urban areas of Madagascar due to the impoverishment of the country. Lack of proper infrastructure, lack of sanitation and waste removal, little clean water, and scarce health facilities create a perfect breeding ground for rats and fleas to thrive. Although plague is prevalent in other countries, Madagascar has the highest fatality and accounts for 30% of all plague cases largely due to poverty and lack of health resources like antibiotics and proper testing. Furthermore, outbreaks of plague have become increasingly more severe due to bubonic plague going untreated and developing into pneumonic plague. Once plague becomes pneumonic, it is significantly more contagious and is transmittable person to person.

=== Severity ===
Recently, plague outbreaks have become increasingly more severe. The most recent outbreak in August 2017 is the worst to date with over 1,800 confirmed cases of plague. Of these confirmed cases, 1,100 of them were cases of pneumonic plague. 114 districts of Madagascar were affected by the plague outbreak. Usually, endemic plague only affects around 20 rural districts. This outbreak was different in nature due to the fact that the plague shifted from rural geographic location to urban geographic location. Plague was found in major shipping ports like Mahajanga and in the capital Antananarivo. The capital alone is home to 2.7 million people. Plague moving into urban areas increased transmission rates due to the high volume of people living in these areas and the amount of trade traffic that occurs on a daily basis.

== Response to the disease ==
Madagascar proposed a National Plague Control Program, which is a surveillance program run by the government and the Ministry of Health that is based on immediate notification of every suspected case of plague. Every case reported to the National Plague Control Program is treated with antibiotics. In addition to this course of treatment, insecticide is brought to the home or work for flea control. Although the ideas and intentions of the National Plague Control Program are good and in theory could be very beneficial to treating and preventing outbreaks of plague, severe economic limitations make the execution of this program less than ideal. Furthermore, disparities in rural areas compared to urban areas make accessibility and testing in rural areas challenging. Economic resources need to be strengthened before this program can live up to its full potential. After the most recent, major outbreak, the WHO created a Crisis Emergency Committee to monitor the situation. They deployed epidemiologists, doctors, and risk management coordinators in order to coordinate surveillance, facilitate tracing contacts, oversee case management, administer isolation protocol, and distribute supplies. In addition to the new committee, Madagascar reallocated funds in order to help with isolation, treatment, and supplies. These solutions to the outbreak helped, as cases of plague declined and hospitalized patients decreased in volume.

== Other countries ==
Twelve more cases of suspected plague appeared in the Seychelles days after the death of a 34-year-old male who had recently traveled to Madagascar and who was confirmed as having pneumonic plague on 10 October 2017. Air Seychelles suspended all flights to Madagascar. More sophisticated tests later showed that the infection was not plague.

A South African basketball player who contracted plague while attending a tournament in Madagascar was successfully treated and returned home. The type of plague the player had was not reported, but one of the cases in the Seychelles who died of pneumonic plague was thought to have attended the same tournament.

The World Health Organization warned that there was a high risk the disease could spread to nine other countries in Africa and the Indian Ocean (Ethiopia, Kenya, Tanzania, Mozambique, South Africa, Seychelles, Comoros, Réunion and Mauritius) because of frequent trade and travel with Madagascar.

== See also ==
- History of plague
