= History of plague =

Globally about 600 cases of plague are reported a year. In 2017 and November 2019 the countries with the most cases include the Democratic Republic of the Congo, Madagascar, and Peru.

Local outbreaks of the plague are grouped into three plague pandemics, whereby the respective start and end dates and the assignment of some outbreaks to either pandemic are still subject to discussion. The pandemics were:

- the first plague pandemic from 541 to ~750, spreading from Egypt to the Mediterranean (starting with the Plague of Justinian) and northwestern Europe
- the second plague pandemic from ~1331 to ~1855, spreading from Central Asia to the Mediterranean and Europe (starting with the Black Death), and probably also to China
- the third plague pandemic from 1855 to 1960, spreading from China to various places around the world, notably India and the West Coast of the United States.

However, the late medieval Black Death (roughly 1331 to 1353) is sometimes seen not as the start of the second, but as the end of the first pandemic – in that case, the first pandemic ended in around 1353, and the second pandemic's start would be about 1361. Also various end dates of the second pandemic are given in the literature, ranging from about 1840 to 1890.

== Antiquity ==
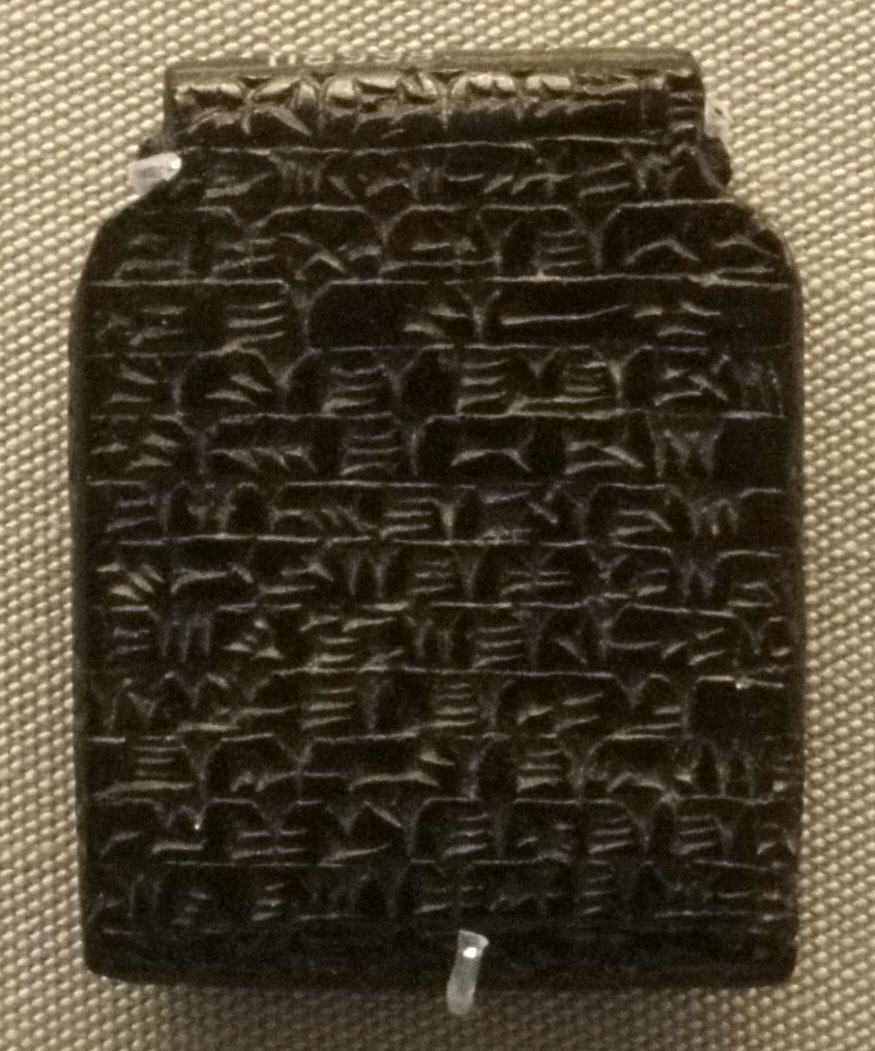
Amulet (800–612 BC) to ward off plague inscribed with a quotation from the Akkadian Erra Epic

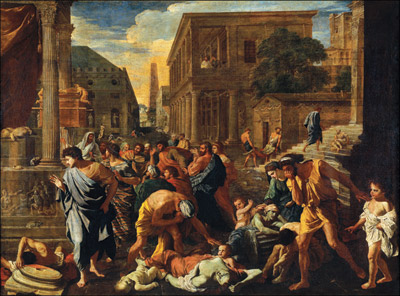
Nicolas Poussin, The Plague of Ashdod, 1630. Oil on canvas, 148 x 198 cm. Musée du Louvre, Paris, France, Giraudon/Bridgeman Art Library.

The word plague is believed to come from the Latin word plāga ("blow, wound") and plangere ("to strike, or to strike down"), via the German Plage ("infestation").

Some authors have suggested that the plague was responsible for the Neolithic decline. That is supported by the discovery of a tomb in modern-day Sweden containing 79 corpses buried within a short time, in which the authors discovered fragments of a unique strain of the plague pathogen Yersinia pestis.

Plasmids of Y. pestis have been detected in archaeological samples of the teeth of seven Bronze Age individuals from 5000 years ago (3000 BC), in the Afanasievo culture in Siberia, the Corded Ware culture in Estonia, the Sintashta culture in Russia, the Unetice culture in Poland and the Andronovo culture in Siberia. Y. pestis existed over Eurasia during the Bronze Age. Estimates of the age of the most recent common ancestor of all Y. pestis is estimated at 5,783 years Before Present.

The Yersinia murine toxin (ymt) allows the bacteria to infect fleas, which can then transmit bubonic plague. Early ancestral versions of Y. pestis did not have the ymt gene, which was only detected in a 951 calibrated BC sample.

The Amarna letters and the Plague Prayers of Mursili II describe an outbreak of a disease among the Hittites. The First Book of Samuel describes a possible plague outbreak in Philistia, and the Septuagint version says it was caused by a "ravaging of mice".

In the second year of the Peloponnesian War (430 BC), Thucydides described an epidemic disease which was said to have begun in Ethiopia, passed through Egypt and Libya, then come to the Greek world. In the Plague of Athens, the city lost possibly one third of its population, including Pericles. Modern historians disagree on whether the plague was a critical factor in the loss of the war. Although this epidemic has long been considered an outbreak of plague, many modern scholars believe that typhus, smallpox, or measles may better fit the surviving descriptions. A recent study of DNA found in the dental pulp of plague victims suggests that typhoid was actually responsible.

In the first century AD, Rufus of Ephesus, a Greek anatomist, refers to an outbreak of plague in Libya, Egypt, and Syria. He records that Alexandrian doctors named Dioscorides and Posidonius described symptoms including acute fever, pain, agitation, and delirium. Buboes—large, hard, and non-suppurating—developed behind the knees, around the elbows, and "in the usual places." The death toll of those infected was very high. Rufus also wrote that similar buboes were reported by a Dionysius Curtus, who may have practiced medicine in Alexandria in the third century BC. If this is correct, the eastern Mediterranean world may have been familiar with bubonic plague at that early date.

In the second century, the Antonine Plague, named after Marcus Aurelius' family name of Antoninus and also known as the Plague of Galen, who had first hand knowledge of the disease, may in fact have been smallpox. Galen was in Rome when it struck in 166 AD, and was also present in the winter of 168–69 during an outbreak among troops stationed at Aquileia; he had experience with the epidemic, referring to it as very long lasting, and describes its symptoms and his treatment of it, though his references are scattered and brief. According to Barthold Georg Niebuhr "this pestilence must have raged with incredible fury; it carried off innumerable victims. The ancient world never recovered from the blow inflected upon it by the plague which visited it in the reign of M. Aurelius." The mortality rate of the plague was 7–10 percent; the outbreak in 165/6–168 would have caused approximately 3.5 to 5 million deaths. Otto Seek believes that over half the population of the empire perished. J. F. Gilliam believes that the Antonine plague probably caused more deaths than any other epidemic during the empire before the mid-3rd century.

== First pandemic: Early Middle Ages ==
The Plague of Justinian in AD 541–542 is the first known attack on record, and marks the first firmly recorded pattern of bubonic plague. This disease is thought to have originated in China. It then spread to Africa from where the huge city of Constantinople imported massive amounts of grain, mostly from Egypt, to feed its citizens. The grain ships were the source of contagion for the city, with massive public granaries nurturing the rat and flea population. At its peak, Procopius said the plague was killing 10,000 people in Constantinople every day. The real number was more likely close to 5,000 a day. The plague ultimately killed perhaps 40% of the city's inhabitants, and then continued to kill up to a quarter of the human population of the eastern Mediterranean.

In AD 588 a second major wave of plague spread through the Mediterranean into what is now France. It is estimated that the Plague of Justinian killed as many as 100 million people across the world. It caused Europe's population to drop by around 50% between 541 and 700. It also may have contributed to the success of the Arab conquests. An outbreak of it in the AD 560s was described in AD 790 as causing "swellings in the glands ... in the manner of a nut or date" in the groin "and in other rather delicate places followed by an unbearable fever". While the swellings in this description have been identified by some as buboes, there is some contention as to whether the pandemic should be attributed to the bubonic plague, Yersinia pestis, known in modern times.

== Second pandemic: from 14th century to 19th century ==
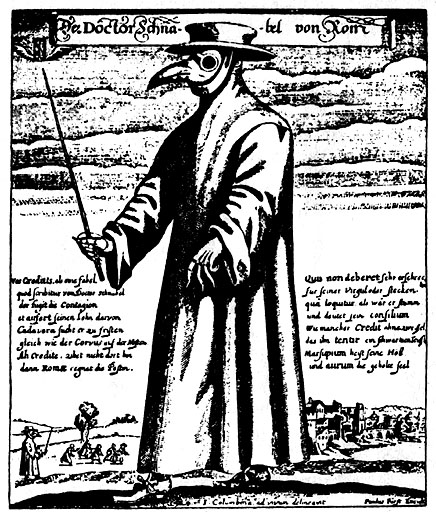
"Der Doktor Schnabel von Rom" ("Doctor Beak of Rome"). The beak is a primitive gas mask, stuffed with substances (such as spices and herbs) thought to ward off the plague.

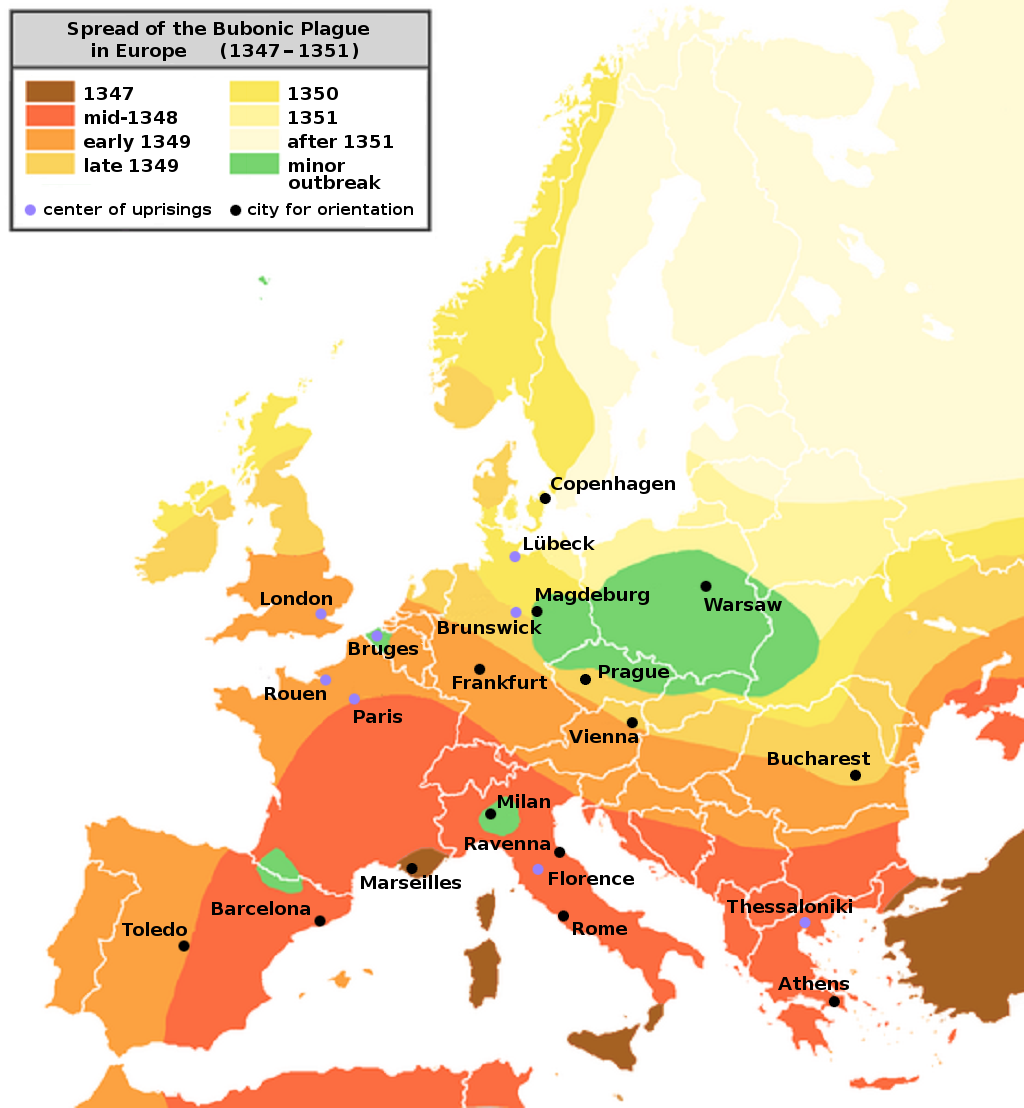
Map showing the spread of the Black Death (bubonic plague) in Europe during the 1331–1351 pandemic which is believed to have started in China and spread west, reaching the Black Sea by 1347

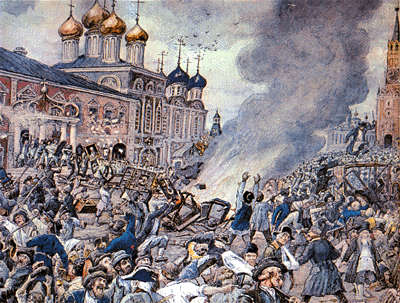
Plague Riot in Moscow in 1771: During the course of the city's plague, between 50,000 and 100,000 died (1/6 to 1/3 of its population).

From 1331 to 1351, the Black Death, a massive and deadly pandemic, spread along the Silk Road and swept through Asia, Europe and Africa. It may have reduced the world's population from 450 million to between 350 and 375 million. China lost around half of its population, from around 123 million to around 65 million; Europe around one third of its population, from about 75 million to about 50 million; and Africa approximately 1/8 of its population, from around 80 million to 70 million (mortality rates tended to be correlated with population density so Africa, being less dense overall, had the lowest death rate). This makes the Black Death the largest death toll from any known non-viral epidemic. Although accurate statistical data does not exist, it is thought that 1.4 million died in England (1/3 of England's 4.2 million people), while an even higher percentage of Italy's population was likely wiped out. On the other hand, north-eastern Germany, Bohemia, Poland and Hungary are believed to have suffered less, and there are no estimates available for Russia or the Balkans. It is conceivable that Russia may not have been as affected due to its very cold climate and large size, hence often less close contact with the contagion.

The plague repeatedly returned to haunt Europe and the Mediterranean throughout the 14th to 17th centuries. According to Biraben, plague was present somewhere in Europe in every year between 1346 and 1671. The Second Pandemic was particularly widespread in the following years: 1360–1363; 1374; 1400; 1438–1439; 1456–1457; 1464–1466; 1481–1485; 1500–1503; 1518–1531; 1544–1548; 1563–1566; 1573–1588; 1596–1599; 1602–1611; 1623–1640; 1644–1654; and 1664–1667; subsequent outbreaks, though severe, marked the retreat from most of Europe (18th century) and northern Africa (19th century). According to Geoffrey Parker, "France alone lost almost a million people to plague in the epidemic of 1628–31."

In England, in the absence of census figures, historians propose a range of pre-incident population figures from as high as 7 million to as low as 4 million in 1300, and a postincident population figure as low as 2 million. By the end of 1350, the Black Death subsided, but it never really died out in England. Over the next few hundred years, further outbreaks occurred in 1361–62, 1369, 1379–83, 1389–93, and throughout the first half of the 15th century. An outbreak in 1471 took as much as 10–15% of the population, while the death rate of the plague of 1479–80 could have been as high as 20%. The most general outbreaks in Tudor and Stuart England seem to have begun in 1498, 1535, 1543, 1563, 1589, 1603, 1625, and 1636, and ended with the Great Plague of London in 1665.

In 1466, perhaps 40,000 people died of plague in Paris. During the 16th and 17th centuries, plague visited Paris for almost one year out of three. The Black Death ravaged Europe for three years before it continued on into Russia, where the disease hit somewhere once every five or six years from 1350 to 1490. Plague epidemics ravaged London in 1563, 1593, 1603, 1625, 1636, and 1665, reducing its population by 10 to 30% during those years. Over 10% of Amsterdam's population died in 1623–1625, and again in 1635–1636, 1655, and 1664. There were 22 outbreaks of plague in Venice between 1361 and 1528. The plague of 1576–1577 killed 50,000 in Venice, almost a third of the population. Late outbreaks in central Europe included the Italian Plague of 1629–1631, which is associated with troop movements during the Thirty Years' War, and the Great Plague of Vienna in 1679. Over 60% of Norway's population died from 1348 to 1350. The last plague outbreak ravaged Oslo in 1654.

In the first half of the 17th century, the Great Plague of Milan claimed some 1.7 million victims in Italy, or about 14% of the population. In 1656, the plague killed about half of Naples' 300,000 inhabitants. More than 1.25 million deaths resulted from the extreme incidence of plague in 17th-century Spain. The plague of 1649 probably reduced the population of Seville by half. In 1709–1713, a plague epidemic that followed the Great Northern War (1700–1721, Sweden v. Russia and allies) killed about 100,000 in Sweden, and 300,000 in Prussia. The plague killed two-thirds of the inhabitants of Helsinki, and claimed a third of Stockholm's population. Western Europe's last major epidemic occurred in 1720 in Marseilles, in Central Europe the last major outbreaks happened during the plague during the Great Northern War, and in Eastern Europe during the Russian plague of 1770–72.

The Black Death ravaged much of the Islamic world. Plague was present in at least one location in the Islamic world virtually every year between 1500 and 1850. Plague repeatedly struck the cities of North Africa. Algiers lost 30,000–50,000 to it in 1620–1621, and again in 1654–1657, 1665, 1691, and 1740–1742. Plague remained a major event in Ottoman society until the second quarter of the 19th century. Between 1701 and 1750, 37 larger and smaller epidemics were recorded in Constantinople, and 31 between 1751 and 1800. Baghdad has suffered severely from visitations of the plague, and sometimes two-thirds of its population has been wiped out.

== Third pandemic: 19th and 20th centuries ==
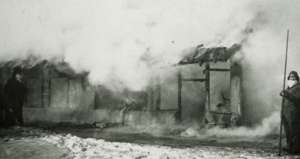
Houses being burned in China in the 1890s during the bubonic plague pandemic

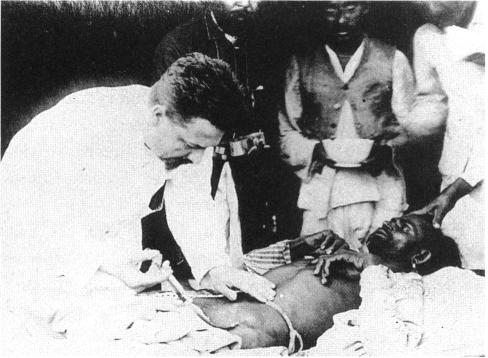
Paul-Louis Simond injecting a plague vaccine in Karachi, 1898

The Third Pandemic began in China's Yunnan province in 1855, spreading plague to all inhabited continents and ultimately killing more than 12 million people in India and China alone. Casualty patterns indicate that waves of this pandemic may have come from two different sources. The first was primarily bubonic and was carried around the world through ocean-going trade, transporting infected persons, rats, and cargoes harboring fleas. The second, more virulent, strain was primarily pneumonic in character, with a strong person-to-person contagion. This strain was largely confined to Manchuria and Mongolia. Researchers during the "Third Pandemic" identified plague vectors and the plague bacterium (see above), leading in time to modern treatment methods.

Plague occurred in Russia in 1877–1889 in rural areas near the Ural Mountains and the Caspian Sea. Efforts in hygiene and patient isolation reduced the spread of the disease, with approximately 420 deaths in the region. Significantly, the region of Vetlianka in this area is near a population of the bobak marmot, a small rodent considered a very dangerous plague reservoir. The last significant Russian outbreak of Plague was in Siberia in 1910 after sudden demand for marmot skins (a substitute for sable) increased the price by 400 percent. The traditional hunters would not hunt a sick Marmot and it was taboo to eat the fat from under the arm (the axillary lymphatic gland that often harboured the plague) so outbreaks tended to be confined to single individuals. The price increase, however, attracted thousands of Chinese hunters from Manchuria who not only caught the sick animals but also ate the fat, which was considered a delicacy. The plague spread from the hunting grounds to the terminus of the Chinese Eastern Railway and then followed the track for 2,700 km. The plague lasted 7 months and killed 60,000 people.

The bubonic plague continued to circulate through different ports globally for the next fifty years; however, it was primarily found in Southeast Asia. The 1894 Hong Kong plague had particularly high death rates, 90%. As late as 1897, medical authorities in the European powers organized a conference in Venice, seeking ways to keep the plague out of Europe. Mumbai plague epidemic struck the city of Bombay (Mumbai) in 1896. The disease reached the Territory of Hawaii in December 1899, and the Board of Health's decision to initiate controlled burns of select buildings in Honolulu's Chinatown turned into an uncontrolled fire which led to the inadvertent burning of most of Chinatown on January 20, 1900. Shortly thereafter, plague reached the continental US, initiating the San Francisco plague of 1900–1904. Plague persisted in Hawaii on the outer islands of Maui and Hawaii (The Big Island) until it was finally eradicated in 1960.

Research done by a team of biologists from the Institute of Pasteur in Paris and Johannes Gutenberg University Mainz in Germany by analyzing the DNA and proteins from plague pits, published in October 2010, reported beyond doubt that all 'the three major plagues' were due to at least two previously unknown strains of Yersinia pestis and originated from China. A team of medical geneticists led by Mark Achtman of University College Cork in Ireland reconstructed a family tree of the bacterium and concluded in an online issue of Nature Genetics published on 31 October 2010 that all three of the great waves of plague originated from China.

== Modern cases ==
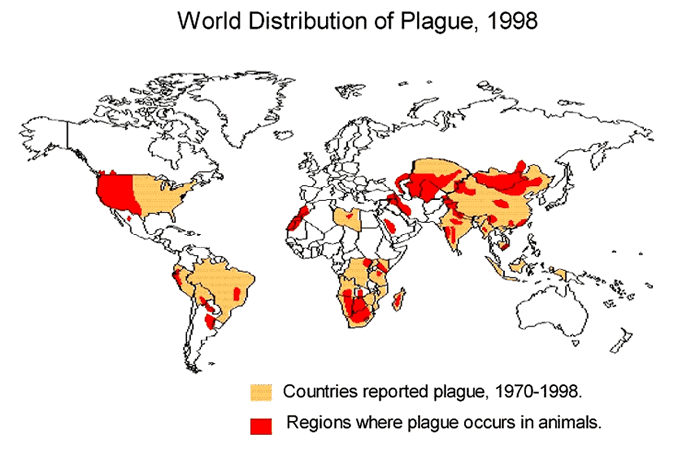
Distribution of plague infected animals and people, as of 1998.

Plague cases were massively reduced during the second half of the 20th century, but outbreaks still occurred, especially in developing countries. Between 1954 and 1997, human plague was reported in 38 countries, making the disease a re-emerging threat to human health. Between 1987 and 2001, 36,876 confirmed cases of plague with 2,847 deaths are reported to the World Health Organization.

In the 21st century, fewer than 200 people die of the plague worldwide each year, mainly due to lack of treatment. Plague is considered to be endemic in 26 countries around the world, with most cases found in remote areas of Africa. The three most endemic countries are Madagascar, the Democratic Republic of the Congo and Peru. Outbreaks with dozens of deaths occurred in Madagascar in 2014 and 2017, in India in 1994, and Congo in 2006.

During 1995, plague was confirmed in the United States from nine western states. Currently, five to 15 people in the United States are estimated to catch the disease each year — typically in western states. The reservoir is thought to be mice. In the U.S., about half of all fatal cases of plague since 1970 have occurred in New Mexico. There were two plague deaths in the state in 2006, the first fatalities in 12 years. In New Mexico, four people were diagnosed with the plague in 2015; one died. In 2016, four were diagnosed and all were treated with success. Three others were diagnosed by late June in 2017. Vegetation such as pinyon and juniper trees are thought to support rodents such as the prairie dog and rock squirrel, with their fleas, according to Paul Ettestad of the New Mexico Department of Health. Ettestad also noted that pets can bring back fleas from dead rodents. The CDC indicates that over the past century, plague in the U.S. has been most common in areas of northern New Mexico, northwestern Arizona and southern Colorado.

There was an outbreak of the bubonic plague in the Nyimba District of Eastern Province, Zambia in 2015. Epidemiologists estimated a basic reproduction number of 1.75 with a 95 percent confidence interval ranging from 1.51 to 1.98. This is almost certainly substantially lower than how the plague propagated during the Black Death pandemic of the fourteenth century with the living conditions and existing genetic diversity in the human population at that time.
