= Secrets of the Dead =

PBS television series

- Genre: Historical documentary
- Narrated by: Roy Scheider; Liev Schreiber; Jay O. Sanders
- Theme music composer: Michael Montes & Jeff Heffernan
- Countries of origin: United States; United Kingdom
- Original language: English
- No. of seasons: 23 (US)
- No. of episodes: 107 + 6 specials (US)

Production
- Executive producer: Jared Lipworth
- Producers: Thirteen/WNET; Quickfire Media; David Johnson; Lucy Palmer; Five (UK); Channel 4 International(UK)
- Camera setup: multiple
- Running time: 56 minutes

Original release
- Network: PBS; NJN
- Release: May 15, 2000 – present

Secrets of the Dead, produced by WNET 13 New York, is an ongoing PBS television series which began in 2000. The show generally follows an investigator or team of investigators exploring what modern science can tell viewers about some of the great mysteries of history. Most programs incorporate primary source material, first-hand accounts, dramatic reenactments, and computer-generated imagery (CGI) to tell the story. The series originated in a series of the same name in the United Kingdom first shown by Channel 4 in 1999. The first two seasons for each country were broadly similar, but thereafter diverged. The US series includes some programs shown in other Channel 4 series (e.g. Secret History). In the case of original British episodes, PBS re-edited, re-branded and finally re-narrated them with various American voice artists. PBS description: "Scientists seek to uncover celebrated mysteries of the past in this occasional British series."

Episode topics (Which are listed in different order on PBS) have included the Titanic, D-Day, the Shroud of Turin, the Salem Witch Trials, Blackbeard's lost ship, and the first English translations of the Bible.

The PBS series premiered on May 15, 2000, airing four programs in three days (the first episode, concerning the Extreme weather events of 535–536, was a two-parter). Despite an irregular schedule, new episodes continue to air.

== Episodes — UK series ==
=== Season 1 (1999) ===
- Ep. 1: "Blood Red Roses" (1999-06-29 — US S4#1)
- Ep. 2: "What Happened to the Hindenburg?" (1999-07-06 — US S1#4)
- Ep. 3: "The Lost Vikings" (1999-07-13 — US S1#3)
- Ep. 4: "Cannibals of the Canyon" (1999-07-20 — US S1#5 "Cannibalism in the Canyon")
- Ep. 5: "Catastrophe – The Day the Sun Went Out" (1999-07-27 — US S1#1)
- Ep. 6: "Catastrophe – How the World Changed" (1999-08-03 — US S1#2)

=== Season 2 (2000) ===
- Ep. 1: "Murder at Stonehenge" (2000-07-17 — US S2#2)
- Ep. 2: "The Syphilis Enigma" (2000-07-24 — US S2#6)
- Ep. 3: "Murder in Jamestown" (2000-07-31 — US S2#3 "Death at Jamestown")
- Ep. 4: "Bewitched" (2000-08-07 — US S2#1 "Witches Curse")
- Ep. 5: "Blood on the Altar" (2000-08-14)
- Ep. 6: "What Sank the Mary Rose?" (2000-08-21)

=== Season 3 (2001) ===
- Ep. 1: "The Riddle of Pompeii" (2001-02-01)
- Ep. 2: "The Hidden Scrolls of Herculaneum" (2001-02-08)
- Ep. 3: "Gladiator Girl" (2001-05-14)
- Ep. 4: "Sounds from the Stone Age" (2001-11-12)
- Ep. 5: "The First Human?" (2001-11-19 — US S3#1 "Search for the First Human")
- Ep. 6: "Mystery of Zulu Dawn" (2001-12-03 — US S2#4 "Day of the Zulu")
- Ep. 7: "Who Burnt Rome?" (2001-12-10 — US S3#4 "The Great Fire of Rome")
- Ep. 8: "King Midas's Feast" (2001-12-30)

=== Season 4 (2002) ===
- Ep. 1: "Riddle of the Plague Survivors" (2002-02-24)
- Ep. 2: "The Birth of the Smart Bomber" (2002-03-03)
- Ep. 3: "Quest for Noah's Flood" (2002-03-16)

=== Season 5 (2003–04) ===
- Ep. 1: "Titanic's Ghost" (2003-03-13 — US S3#3)
- Ep. 2: "The Coldest March" (2003-03-20 — US S3#5 "Tragedy at the Pole")
- Ep. 3: "Plague on the Western Front" (2003-03-27)
- Ep. 4: "Shroud of Christ?" (2004-03-29 — US S4#4)

== Episodes — US series ==
=== Specials (2014-17) ===
- Ep. 1: "Dick Cavett's Watergate" (2014-08-08)
- Ep. 2: "Secrets of Spanish Florida" (2017-12-26)
- Ep. 3: "America’s Untold Story - Struggle to Survive" (2017-12-26)
- Ep. 4: "America’s Untold Story - Men of God, Men of Greed" (2018-01-02)
- Ep. 5: "America’s Untold Story - The British Are Coming" (2018-01-09)
- Ep. 6: "America’s Untold Story - The 14th and 15th Colonies" (2018-01-18)

=== Season 1 (2000) ===
No. in season	Title	Original release date
1	"Catastrophe! Part 1: The Day the Sun Went Out"	May 15, 2000
Research into the Volcanic winter of 536 and its possible role in triggering the societal disruptions associated with the Early Middle Ages.
2	"Catastrophe! Part 2: How the World Changed"	May 15, 2000
The hypothesis that an eruption of Krakatoa contributed to the Volcanic winter of 536 and the resulting climatic, social, and religious changes across the world.
3	"The Lost Vikings"	May 16, 2000
An investigation into the disappearance of the Norse colonization of Greenland through archaeological and scientific evidence from former Viking settlements.
4	"What Happened to the Hindenburg?"	May 17, 2000
An examination of the causes of the Hindenburg disaster, focusing on theories about the airship’s outer covering and the ignition of the fire.
5	"Cannibalism in the Canyon"	May 17, 2000
Research into the decline of the Ancestral Puebloans in present-day New Mexico and the factors that may have contributed to the abandonment of their settlements.

=== Season 2 (2001) ===
No. in season	Title	Original release date
1	"Witches Curse"	June 26, 2001
The mysterious illnesses of Elizabeth Parris and Abigail Williams that preceded the Salem witch trials in colonial Massachusetts in 1692.
2	"Murder at Stonehenge"	July 3, 2001
Archaeologist Mike Pitts uses forensic science to investigate the death of a man found buried near Stonehenge with his head separated from his body.
3	"Death at Jamestown"	July 10, 2001
An investigation into the high mortality rate among early settlers of Jamestown, Virginia, and the role of disease, colonial conditions, and Spanish intelligence in the colony’s history.
4	"Day of the Zulu"	July 17, 2001
An examination of the Battle of Isandlwana and how the Zulu army defeated British forces during the Anglo-Zulu War.
5	"Tomb of Christ"	July 24, 2001
The history and archaeological study of the Church of the Holy Sepulchre, traditionally identified as the site of Jesus’s burial and resurrection.
6	"The Syphilis Enigma"	July 31, 2001
The debate over the origins of syphilis and archaeological evidence challenging the theory that the disease reached Europe from the Americas after Christopher Columbus’s voyages.

=== Season 3 (2002–03) ===
No. in season	Title	Original release date
1	"Search for the First Human"	May 8, 2002
The discovery of 13 ancient hominid fossils in 2000 and their significance to understanding Human evolution and the divergence of humans and apes.
2	"Mystery of the Black Death"	October 30, 2002
Genetic research into why some residents of Eyam survived the Great Plague of 1665 while others succumbed to bubonic plague.
3	"Titanic's Ghosts"	November 20, 2002
Scientific advances offer three families of passengers lost in the Titanic disaster the possibility of identifying relatives whose bodies were recovered but remain unidentified.
4	"The Great Fire of Rome"	November 27, 2002
The causes and aftermath of the Great Fire of Rome in 64 AD, including the reliability of Tacitus's account and the accusations against Nero and early Christianity.
5	"Tragedy at the Pole"	January 15, 2003
The deaths of Robert Falcon Scott and his companions during the Terra Nova Expedition, examining the extreme weather conditions and other factors that may have contributed to their fate.
6	"Bombing Nazi Dams"	February 12, 2003
The development and use of the bouncing bomb during Operation Chastise, the 1943 Dambusters Raid targeting German dams in World War II.

=== Season 4 (2003–04) ===
No. in season	Title	Original release date	Prod. code
1	"Bridge on the River Kwai"	November 12, 2003	401
The construction and destruction of the Burma Railway during World War II, including the forced labor of Allied POWs and the role of the bridge at Kanchanaburi.
2	"Killer Flu"	March 3, 2004	402
Research into the origins and exceptional virulence of the 1918 influenza pandemic, examining the H1N1 influenza virus and the factors behind its global mortality.
3	"Shroud of Christ?"	April 7, 2004	403
Scientific and historical investigations into the Shroud of Turin, examining its origins and the debate over whether it bears the image and blood of Jesus.
4	"D-Day"	May 19, 2004	404
The planning and execution of Operation Overlord, the Allied invasion of Normandy on D-Day in 1944, and the military strategy that led to the liberation of German-occupied France.
5	"Amazon Warrior Women"	August 4, 2004	405
Archaeologist Jeannine Davis-Kimball investigates possible links between ancient warrior women of the Eurasian Steppe and a remote village in western Mongolia.

=== Season 5 (2005–06) ===
No. in season	Title	Original release date
1	"The Hunt for Nazi Scientists"	October 19, 2005
2	"Gangland Graveyard"	November 16, 2005
3	"Voyage of the Courtesans"	November 23, 2005
4	"The Sinking of the Andrea Doria"	July 26, 2006
5	"Umbrella Assassin"	October 4, 2006

=== Season 6 (2006–07) ===
No. in season	Title	Original release date	Prod. code
1	"Dogfight Over Guadalcanal"	November 8, 2006	601
2	"Battle for the Bible"	April 25, 2007	602
3	"Herculaneum Uncovered"	May 2, 2007	603
4	"Headless Romans"	May 9, 2007	604
5	"Irish Escape"	May 16, 2007	605

=== Season 7 (2008) ===
No. in season	Title	Original release date	Prod. code
1	"Aztec Massacre"	April 23, 2008	701
2	"Escape from Auschwitz"	April 30, 2008	702

=== Season 8 (2008–09) ===
No. in season	Title	Original release date	Prod. code
1	"Doping for Gold"	May 7, 2008	801
2	"Sinking Atlantis"	May 14, 2008	802
3	"Executed in Error"	October 1, 2008	803
4	"Blackbeard's Lost Ship"	April 22, 2009	804

=== Season 9 (2009–10) ===
No. in season	Title	Original release date	Prod. code
1	"Michelangelo Revealed"	May 13, 2009	901
2	"The Airmen and the Headhunters"	November 11, 2009	902
3	"Mumbai Massacre"	November 25, 2009	903
4	"Japanese SuperSub"	May 5, 2010	TBA

=== Season 10 (2010) ===
No. in season	Title	Original release date	Prod. code
1	"Churchill's Deadly Decision"	May 12, 2010	1001
2	"Deadliest Battle"	May 19, 2010	1002
3	"The Silver Pharaoh"	November 3, 2010	1003
4	"Slave Ship Mutiny"	November 10, 2010	1004

=== Season 11 (2010–11) ===
No. in season	Title	Original release date	Prod. code
1	"Lost Ships of Rome"	November 17, 2010	1101
2	"Lost in the Amazon"	April 20, 2011	1102
3	"China's Terracotta Warriors"	May 4, 2011	1103
4	"World's Biggest Bomb"	May 17, 2011	1104

=== Season 12 (2012–13) ===
No. in season	Title	Original release date	Prod. code
1	"The Man Who Saved the World"	October 24, 2012	1201
Soviet Navy officer Vasily Arkhipov's actions during the Cuban Missile Crisis.
2	"Bugging Hitler's Soldiers"	May 1, 2013	1202
3	"Death on the Railroad"	May 8, 2013	1203
4	"Caveman Cold Case"	May 15, 2013	1204
Narrated by Jay O. Sanders
5	"Ultimate Tut"	July 10, 2013	1205
2-hour episode narrated by Jay O. Sanders
6	"Bones of the Buddha"	July 23, 2013	1206
Host explorer Charles Allen, narrated by Jay O. Sanders (Charles Dance in the UK version

=== Season 13 (2013–14) ===
No. in season	Title	Original release date	Prod. code
1	"JFK: One PM Central Standard Time"	November 13, 2013	1301
Narrated by George Clooney
2	"The Lost Diary of Dr. Livingstone"	March 26, 2014	1302
3	"Carthage's Lost Warriors"	April 2, 2014	1303
4	"The Lost Gardens of Babylon"	May 6, 2014	1304
5	"The Mona Lisa Mystery"	July 9, 2014	1305
Written and directed by Klaus T. Steindl; Experts examine the controversy over whether the Isleworth Mona Lisa was painted by Leonardo da Vinci
Special	"Dick Cavett's Watergate"	August 8, 2014	TBA
6	"Resurrecting Richard III"	September 24, 2014	1306

=== Season 14 (2015) ===
No. in season	Title	Original release date	Prod. code
1	"Ben Franklin's Bones"	January 28, 2015	1401
2	"JFK & LBJ: A Time for Greatness"	August 4, 2015	TBA
Narrated by Morgan Freeman
3	"The Real Trojan Horse"	October 13, 2015	1402
4	"Jamestown's Dark Winter"	November 24, 2015	1403

=== Season 15 (2015–16) ===
No. in season	Title	Original release date	Prod. code
1	"Vampire Legend"	October 27, 2015	1501
2	"The Alcatraz Escape"	March 29, 2016	1503
3	"Cleopatra's Lost Tomb"	May 17, 2016	1502
4	"Teotihuacán's Lost Kings"	May 24, 2016	1504
5	"Graveyard of the Giant Beasts"	November 2, 2016	1505

=== Season 16 (2016–19) ===
No. in season	Title	Original release date	Prod. code
1	"After Stonehenge"	October 26, 2016	1601
2	"Van Gogh's Ear"	December 14, 2016	1602
3	"Nero's Sunken City"	March 29, 2017	1603
Archaeologists map the underwater ruins of Baiae, ancient Rome's version of Las Vegas
4	"Leonardo, the Man Who Saved Science"	April 5, 2017	1604
Special	"Secrets of Spanish Florida"	December 26, 2017	TBA
AMFC — 2 hours
5	"The Woman in the Iron Coffin"	October 3, 2018	1605
Forensic experts investigate the preserved remains of a young 19th century New York African American woman and reveal details of early America's free black communities.
6	"The Nero Files"	February 20, 2019	1606
The life and legend of Nero are examined by a forensic profiler.

=== Season 17 (2018–20) ===
No. in season	Title	Original release date	Prod. code
1	"Scanning the Pyramids"	January 24, 2018	1701
2	"Hannibal in the Alps"	April 10, 2018	1702
A team of experts determines which of 4 possible routes was used by Hannibal
3	"King Arthur's Lost Kingdom"	March 27, 2019	1703
New archaeological evidence that rewrites our understanding of 5th and 6th century Britain might also explain the legend of King Arthur.
4	"Egypt's Darkest Hour"	April 3, 2019	1704
The discovery of a rare mass grave with the bones of nearly 60 people outside Luxor sends archaeologists on a quest to find out who the remains belong to, why they were buried the way they were and what was happening in ancient Egypt that would have led to a mass burial.
5	"World War Speed"	June 25, 2019	1705
Historian James Holland, on his quest to understand how the use of amphetamines affected the course of World War II and unleashed “the world's first pharmacological arms race.” Shown in the UK on BBC Four as a standalone, Aug 29, 2019.
6	"Abandoning the Titanic"	November 4, 2020	1706
Weighs the evidence concerning the "mystery" ship seen from the deck of the sinking Titanic

=== Season 18 (2019–22) ===
No. in season	Title	Original release date	Prod. code
1	"Galileo's Moon"	July 2, 2019	1801
The authentication of a purported proof copy of Sidereus Nuncius attributed to Galileo Galilei, examining its significance and disputed authenticity.
2	"Bombing Auschwitz"	January 21, 2020	1802
The debate over whether the Allies of World War II should have bombed Auschwitz concentration camp to halt ongoing atrocities during the Holocaust.
3	"Building Notre Dame"	April 28, 2020	1803
The centuries-long construction of Notre-Dame de Paris and the architectural, technical, and human challenges behind its development.
4	"Viking Warrior Queen"	July 7, 2020	1804
The analysis of a prominent Viking grave, including DNA evidence indicating a female warrior and its implications for understanding Norse society.
5	"Gangster's Gold"	November 18, 2020	1805
Searches for the lost treasure of Dutch Schultz using modern technology and new evidence to revisit a long-standing mystery from the Prohibition in the United States.
6	"The End of the Romans"	October 26, 2022	1806
Scientific research examining the roles of climate change and epidemic disease in the decline of the Roman Empire.

=== Season 19 (2021) ===
No. in season	Title	Original release date	Prod. code
1	"Magellan's Crossing"	October 20, 2021	1901
The voyage of Ferdinand Magellan that led to the first circumnavigation of the Earth and its lasting impact on global trade and colonization.
2	"Lady Sapiens"	October 27, 2021	1902
Scientific research examining the lives and roles of women in prehistoric societies around the world.
3	"The First Circle of Stonehenge"	November 3, 2021	1903
Archaeological evidence suggesting that the oldest stones of Stonehenge originated from an earlier stone circle in western Wales.
4	"Hindenburg's Fatal Flaws"	November 10, 2021	1904
An examination of the technical failures and conditions that contributed to the Hindenburg disaster of 1937.
5	"A Samurai in the Vatican"	November 17, 2021	1905
The 17th-century Japanese diplomatic mission led by Hasekura Tsunenaga under Date Masamune to establish relations and trade with Europe.
6	"The Caravaggio Heist"	November 24, 2021	1906
Efforts by Father Marius Zerafa to recover a stolen Caravaggio painting taken from a cathedral in Malta in 1984.

=== Season 20 (2022–23) ===
No. in season	Title	Original release date	Prod. code
1	"Archaeology at Althorp"	October 9, 2022	2001
An archaeological excavation at Althorp, ancestral home of the Spencer family and Diana, Princess of Wales, examining one of the century’s most significant British discoveries.
2	"Last Days of Pompeii"	October 19, 2022	2002
The discovery of a ceremonial chariot in Pompeii providing insight into elite life before the 79 AD eruption of Mount Vesuvius.
3	"Decoding Hieroglyphics"	November 2, 2022	2003
The history of deciphering Egyptian hieroglyphs and recent translations from an ancient Egyptian scribe’s tomb revealing details of life in ancient Egypt.
4	"Hidden in the Amazon"	November 9, 2022	2004
Recent discoveries and technological advances revealing the scale and complexity of pre-Columbian societies in the Amazon rainforest.
5	"The Sunken Basilica"	October 11, 2023	2005
The submerged remains of a 4th-century basilica in Lake İznik and their significance to the study of early Christianity.
6	"Jurassic Fortunes"	October 18, 2023	2006
The international trade in dinosaur fossils, including the auction of the Triceratops specimen “Big John,” and debates surrounding private fossil collecting.

=== Season 21 (2023–24) ===
No. in season	Title	Original release date	Prod. code
1	"Eiffel's Race to the Top"	October 25, 2023	2007
The competition to construct the Eiffel Tower and how its creation transformed the Paris skyline into a global symbol of engineering and modernity.
2	"Death in Britannia"	November 1, 2023	2008
The analysis of a skeleton from Roman Britain bearing physical evidence of Crucifixion, offering rare insight into punishment and daily life under Roman rule.
3	"The Princes in the Tower"	November 22, 2023	2009
An examination of the disappearance of the Princes in the Tower and the historical debate surrounding the possible role of Richard III of England.
4	"Returning to Babylon"	October 2, 2024	TBA
Efforts to recover cultural heritage in Mosul after destruction by the Islamic State of Iraq and the Levant, including surviving artifacts of the Assyrian Empire and a possible link to the Hanging Gardens of Babylon.
5	"Mozart's Sister"	October 9, 2024	TBA
The life of Maria Anna Mozart and her relationship with Wolfgang Amadeus Mozart, including evidence suggesting her possible contributions to his early compositions.
6	"The Herculaneum Scrolls"	October 16, 2024	TBA
Attempts to read the carbonized Herculaneum papyri using computer science and imaging techniques following the 79 AD eruption of Mount Vesuvius that buried the Roman town of Herculaneum.

=== Season 22 (2024-25) ===
No. in season	Title	Original release date	Prod. code
1	"The Civil War's Lost Massacre"	October 23, 2024	TBA
The search for the remains of formerly enslaved Black Union soldiers killed at the end of the Civil War, centered on Camp Nelson, Kentucky.
2	"Field of Vampires"	October 30, 2024	TBA
A 17th-century burial of a woman with unusual restraints, interpreted as anti-vampire practices reflecting local beliefs.
3	"Lost Treasures of Angkor – The Discovery"	November 13, 2024	TBA
Newly discovered artifacts offering insight into early Khmer society before the rise of Angkor as imperial capital.
4	"Lost Treasures of Angkor – King's Gold"	November 20, 2024	TBA
Early Khmer gold and silver artifacts from Laos revealing their origins, production, and cultural context around Vat Phou.
5	"Plunderer: The Life and Times of a Nazi Art Thief (Part One)"	February 19, 2025	TBA
The life of Nazi art dealer Bruno Lohse, Hermann Göring’s collector in Paris, and his post-war return to art dealing, often involving looted works.
6	"Plunderer: The Life and Times of a Nazi Art Thief (Part Two)"	February 26, 2025	TBA
Bruno Lohse’s post-war activities in the United States, including dealings in looted art while original owners sought restitution.
7	"The Rise & Fall of the Colosseum"	October 8, 2025	TBA
The history and influence of the Colosseum, from its role in Roman spectacle and power to its wider impact on the Roman Empire.
8	"Cleopatra's Last Temple"	October 15, 2025	TBA
Ruins submerged in Alexandria’s harbor that may be the remains of a temple associated with Cleopatra and the goddess Isis.
9	"Cracking the Queen's Code"	October 22, 2025	TBA
The decoding of encrypted letters from Mary, Queen of Scots detailing her efforts to escape imprisonment and challenge Queen Elizabeth I.
10	"Chasing the Plague"	October 29, 2025	TBA
Scientists and historians examining the earliest known bubonic plague victims and the societal impact of the disease on medieval Europe.

=== Season 23 (2025-26) ===
No. in season	Title	Original release date	Prod. code
1	"Picturing Shakespeare"	November 12, 2025	TBA
A British man is trying to authenticate a long-owned family portrait as a previously unknown image of William Shakespeare, a discovery that could be worth up to $200 million.
2	"Queens of Combat"	January 28, 2026	TBA
Experts investigate historical and archaeological evidence to determine whether women fought as gladiators in Ancient Rome and what their lives were like.
3	"The Quest for Camelot"	February 4, 2026	TBA
Prof. Mark Horton explores medieval texts and archaeological sites across Britain to uncover the real events and places that may have inspired the legends of King Arthur.
4	"China's Bronze Kingdom"	May 27, 2026	TBA
An exploration of the discovery and archaeological significance of a mysterious ancient city in Sichuan that may be linked to the ancient Shu kingdom.
5	"Africa's Golden City"	October 14, 2026	TBA
The history of Great Zimbabwe, a medieval African trading center built by ancestors of the Shona people whose regional and global significance is being revealed through archaeology.
6	"Raising Lady Liberty"	October 21, 2026	TBA
The history of the Statue of Liberty and the Franco-American collaboration that created the monument as a symbol of freedom and immigration.
7	"Saving Tangier Island"	November 4, 2026	TBA
The history of Tangier Island during the War of 1812, its role in the history of emancipation, and the threat posed by sea level rise.
8	"Finding America's Fallen"	November 11, 2026	TBA
Veterans investigate the Battle of Camden in South Carolina, examining the Continental Army’s defeat during the American Revolutionary War and seeking to honor the fallen soldiers.
