= Mike Baillie =

Michael George Lockhart Baillie (1944–2023) was a leading expert in dendrochronology, or dating by means of tree-rings, and Professor of Palaeoecology at Queen's University of Belfast, in Northern Ireland. In the 1980s, he was instrumental in building a year-by-year chronology of tree-ring growth reaching 7,400 years into the past.

== Comet theories ==
Upon examining the tree-ring record, Baillie noticed indications of severe environmental downturns around 2354 BC, 1628 BC, 1159 BC, 208 BC, and AD 540. He claimed that these environmental downturns were wide-ranging catastrophic events; the AD 540 event in particular is attested in tree-ring chronologies from Siberia through Europe and North and South America. This event coincides with the second largest ammonium signal in the Greenland ice in the last two millennia, the largest being in AD 1014, and both these epochs were accompanied by cometary apparitions. Baillie explained the general absence of mainstream historical references to this event by the fact it was described in terms of biblical metaphors since at that time "Christian beliefs included the dogma that nothing that happens in the heavens could have any conceivable effect on the Earth."

Since then, he devoted much of his attention to uncovering the causes of these global environmental downturns. He believed that impacts from cometary debris may account for most of the downturns, especially the AD 540 event. This hypothesis is supported in work by British cometary astrophysicists, who find that earth was at increased risk of bombardment by cometary debris in the AD 400-600 timeframe, based on the frequency of fireball activity in the Taurid meteor streams recorded in Chinese archives.

To provide further support to his cometary debris theory, Baillie searched the written record and traditions embodied in myths. There he found evidence that the dates of the environmental downturns listed above are often associated with collapses of civilizations or turning points in history. The AD 540 event, for example, may have been associated with a catastrophe that ushered in the Dark Ages of Europe.

His book, Exodus to Arthur: Catastrophic Encounters with Comets (Batsford, 1999), relates the findings of his tree-ring studies to a series of global environmental traumas over the past 4400 years that may mark events such as the biblical Exodus, the disasters which befell Egypt, collapses of Chinese dynasties, and the onset of the European Dark Ages. The Celtic Gods: Comets in Irish Mythology (Tempus, 2005), co-authored with Patrick McCafferty, focuses on the AD 540 event as recorded in the historical records and myths of Ireland and shows that the imagery in the myths and the times between events are consistent with a comet with an earth-crossing orbit similar to P/Encke, as described by the British astronomers Victor Clube and Bill Napier. His latest book, New Light on the Black Death: The Cosmic Connection (Tempus, 2006), shows how the tree-ring and Greenland ice core evidence and descriptions in annals, myths and metaphors adduced in support of the global environmental downturn at AD 540, which included the Justinian plague, also applies to conditions extant at the time of the Black Death in AD 1348.

== Controversy over releasing data ==
In 2010, Baillie became involved in a controversy over the release of his tree-ring data. Baillie claims that the tree-ring data is his own personal intellectual property. The UK Information Commissioner's Office, however, ruled that, because Baillie did all the work while employed at a public university, the data must be released to the public.

== See also ==
- Extreme weather events of 535–536

== Books ==
- Tree-Ring Dating and Archaeology (London: Croom-Helm, 1982).
- A Slice Through Time: dendrochronology and precision dating (London: Routledge, 1995). ISBN 0-7134-7654-0
- Baillie, Mike G L (1999). Exodus to Arthur: Catastrophic Encounters with Comets. London: B.T. Batsford. ISBN 978-0-7134-8681-0. OCLC 41312154.
- The Celtic Gods: Comets in Irish Mythology (Tempus, 2005), co-authored with Patrick McCafferty
- New Light on the Black Death: The Cosmic Connection (Tempus, 2006)
