= Wiggle matching =

Radiocarbon dating method

Wiggle matching, also known as carbon–14 wiggle-match dating (WMD), is a dating method that uses the non-linear relationship between ^{14}C age and calendar age to match the shape of a series of closely sequentially spaced ^{14}C dates with the ^{14}C calibration curve. A numerical approach to WMD allows one to assess the precision of WMD chronologies. The method has both advantages and limitations for the calibration of individual dates. High-precision chronologies are needed for studies of rapid climate changes. Andrew Millard refers to wiggle matching as a way of dealing with the flat portion of the carbon-14 calibration graph that is known as the Hallstatt plateau, named after the Hallstatt culture period in central Europe that it coincides with.

== Methodology ==
Wiggle matching may be used as a complement to ordinary radiocarbon dating in some situations where the latter yields several alternatives. In its simplest form, radiocarbon dating works by taking the logarithm of the proportion of the isotope ^{14}C of the total amount of carbon of both isotopes ^{12}C and ^{14}C in an organic sample. Since ^{12}C is stable, but ^{14}C decays radioactively, the proportion of ^{14}C in a given sample gets smaller with time. There is indeed a linear relationship between that time and the logarithm of the ^{14}C proportion.

Thus, if one knows the ^{14}C proportion that an organic sample contained when it was formed (say, by absorption of atmospheric carbon in photosynthesis), and its lower proportion today, then the precise time since that photosynthesis may be calculated directly (up to measurement errors). However, the ^{14}C proportion in the atmospheric carbon has not been constant. It has varied for several reasons. For instance, ^{14}C is created continuously in the upper atmosphere under the impact of solar energetic particles; and the amount of such particles hitting the Earth varies with the solar cycle. Thus, two samples with the same present ^{14}C proportions may have different ages, since the older one was formed when the ^{14}C proportion happened to be higher.

In fact, the relationship between the present ^{14}C proportion logarithm and the chronological time since the carbon in that sample was bound by photosynthesis does not form a straight line, but a 'wiggling' one. This wiggling often may be observed in some kinds of archaeological finds; in particular, in pieces of wood where a sufficient number of growth rings are discernible. By means of these rings, it may be possible to take a series of samples from one piece of wood, where we know that they were formed with a time distance of (for instance) five years between each sample. In this way, the relative variation of the logarithmic ^{14}C proportion in the years when this piece of wood grew may be determined, sufficiently well to decide which one of a number of possible ages this wood piece has.

== Applications ==
Wiggle matching has a particular use when there are several dates differing by centuries but yielding the same ^{14}C proportions in samples, such as during the Hallstatt plateau.

=== Comparing growth ring series ===
Another application is for matching dendrochronological sequences for different tree species. The growth rings of a tree mostly vary in thickness from year to year. In a 'good' year, the tree grows more and forms a wider growth ring. Dendrochronology is based on the fact that the same years tend to be 'good' or 'bad' for many trees of the same species, especially in not too distant localities. Thus, by comparing growth ring patterns from different trees with overlapping lifetimes, it is possible to form long connected series of growth ring patterns, enabling precise dating of pieces of wood.

However, even in the same forest, 'goodness' and 'badness' may vary with the tree species (and especially for species in different genera). A 'good' year for one species may have been a 'bad' one for another; and another year may have been 'bad' for the first species but 'average' for the second one. Thus, even if it may be possible to form different dendrochronological growth ring series for two different kinds of tree at the same location, these two series cannot be matched directly. This was the situation for growth series for two closely related species of oak (Quercus robur, Quercus petraea) on the one hand and a species of pine (Pinus sylvestris) on the other, both largely from river valleys in Central Europe, together covering the about 12,000 years from the end of the latest glacial period to recent times. In the first one and a half millennium of this time, the climate was too cool for oak; while later it was too warm for pine to be able to compete. Thus, the pine series covered the first two millennia, and the oak series the rest. Thus, the pine series was 'floating'; the distance in years between different growth rings were known, but not quite the absolute years. However, there was an overlap of some centuries; and by means of wiggle matching these two series were robustly joined in 2004, yielding the absolute start year 10641 BC for the pine sequence.
