= Plague of Justinian =

541–549 AD in the Byzantine Empire, later northern Europe

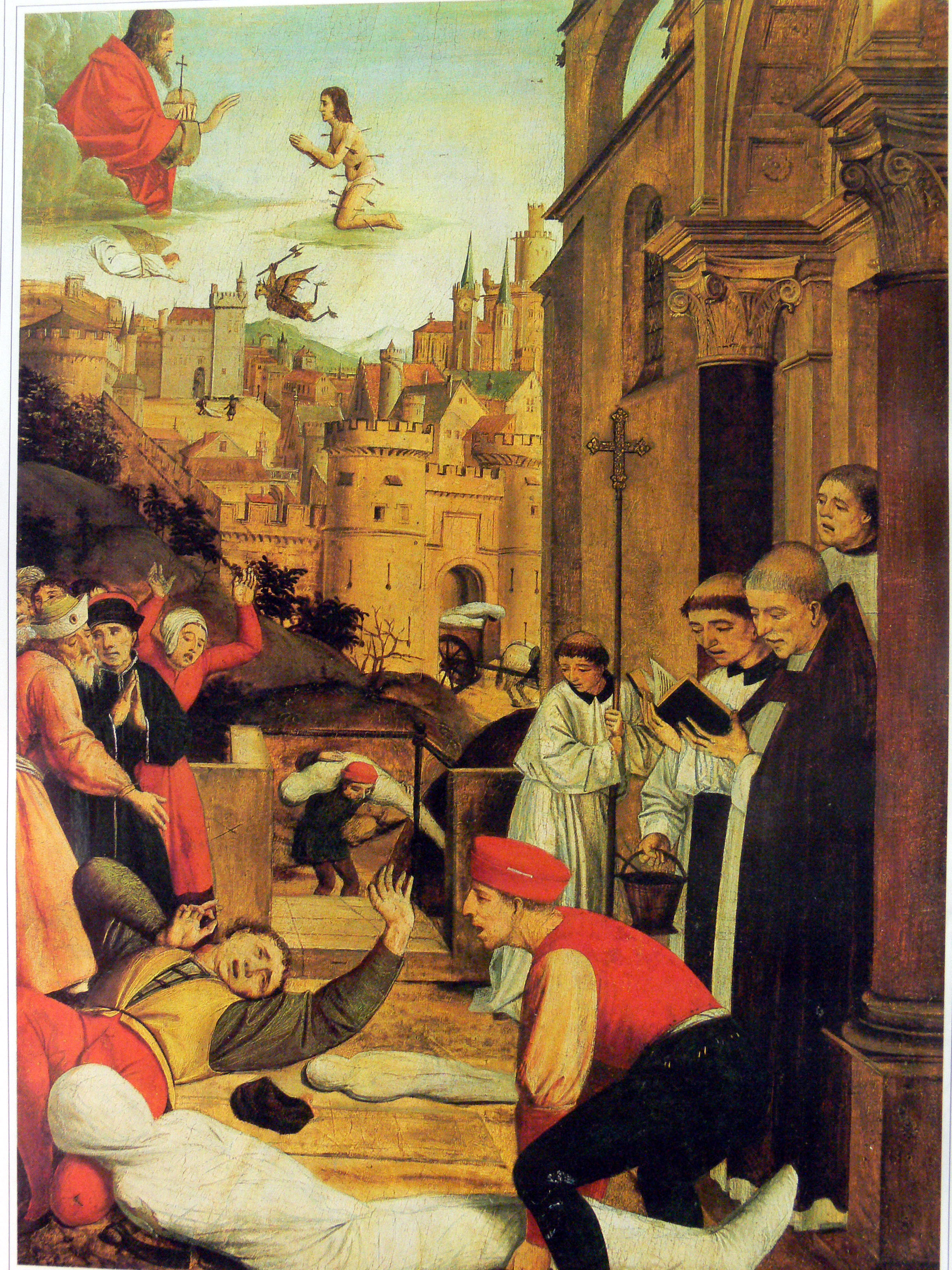
- Saint Sebastian pleads for the life of a gravedigger afflicted during the plague of Justinian. (Josse Lieferinxe, c. 1497–1499)
- Disease: Bubonic plague
- Location: Mediterranean basin, Europe, Near East
- Date: 541–549

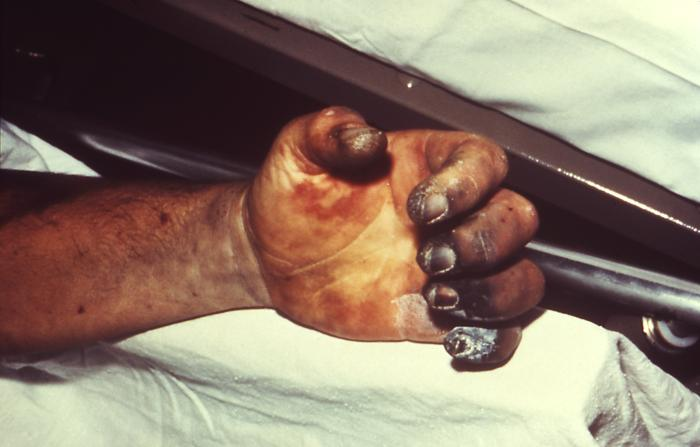
A characteristic of Yersinia pestis infection is necrosis of the hand. (photo from 1975 plague victim)

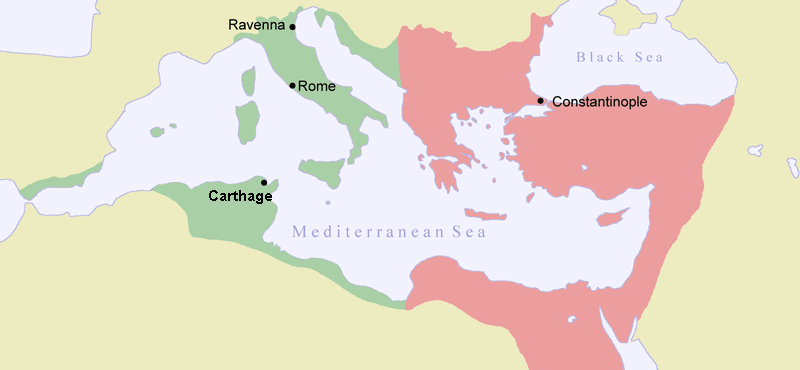
A map of the Byzantine Empire in 550 (a decade after the Plague of Justinian) with Justinian's conquests shown in green

The plague of Justinian or Justinianic plague (AD 541–549) was an epidemic of plague that afflicted the entire Mediterranean Basin, Europe, and the Near East, especially the Sasanian Empire and the Byzantine Empire. The plague is named for the Byzantine Emperor Justinian I (r. 527–565) who, according to his court historian Procopius, contracted the disease and recovered in 542, at the height of the epidemic which killed about a fifth of the population in the imperial capital Constantinople. The contagion arrived in Roman Egypt in 541, spread around the Mediterranean Sea until 544, and persisted in Northern Europe and the Arabian Peninsula until 549. By 543, the plague had spread to every corner of Justinian's empire.

The plague's severity and impact remain debated. Some scholars assert that as the first episode of the first plague pandemic, it had profound economic, social, and political effects across Europe and the Near East and cultural and religious impact on Eastern Roman society. Other scholars such as Mordechai and Eisenberg have argued that the Plague of Justinian was overstated by primary sources and, while it would have been incredibly impactful on a personal level, did not have a severe or even a long lasting impact on the population of the Mediterranean in the Age of Justinian. Consequently, historians continue to debate the pandemic's true demographic impact, with scholars sharply divided over the reliability of contemporary literary accounts.

In 2013, researchers confirmed earlier speculation that the cause of the plague of Justinian was Yersinia pestis, the same bacterium responsible for the Black Death (1346–1353). Ancient and modern Yersinia pestis strains are closely related to the ancestor of the Justinian plague strain that has been found in the Tian Shan, a system of mountain ranges on the borders of Kyrgyzstan, Kazakhstan, and China, suggesting that the Justinian plague originated in or near that region. However, there would appear to be no mention of bubonic plague in China until the year 610.

== History ==
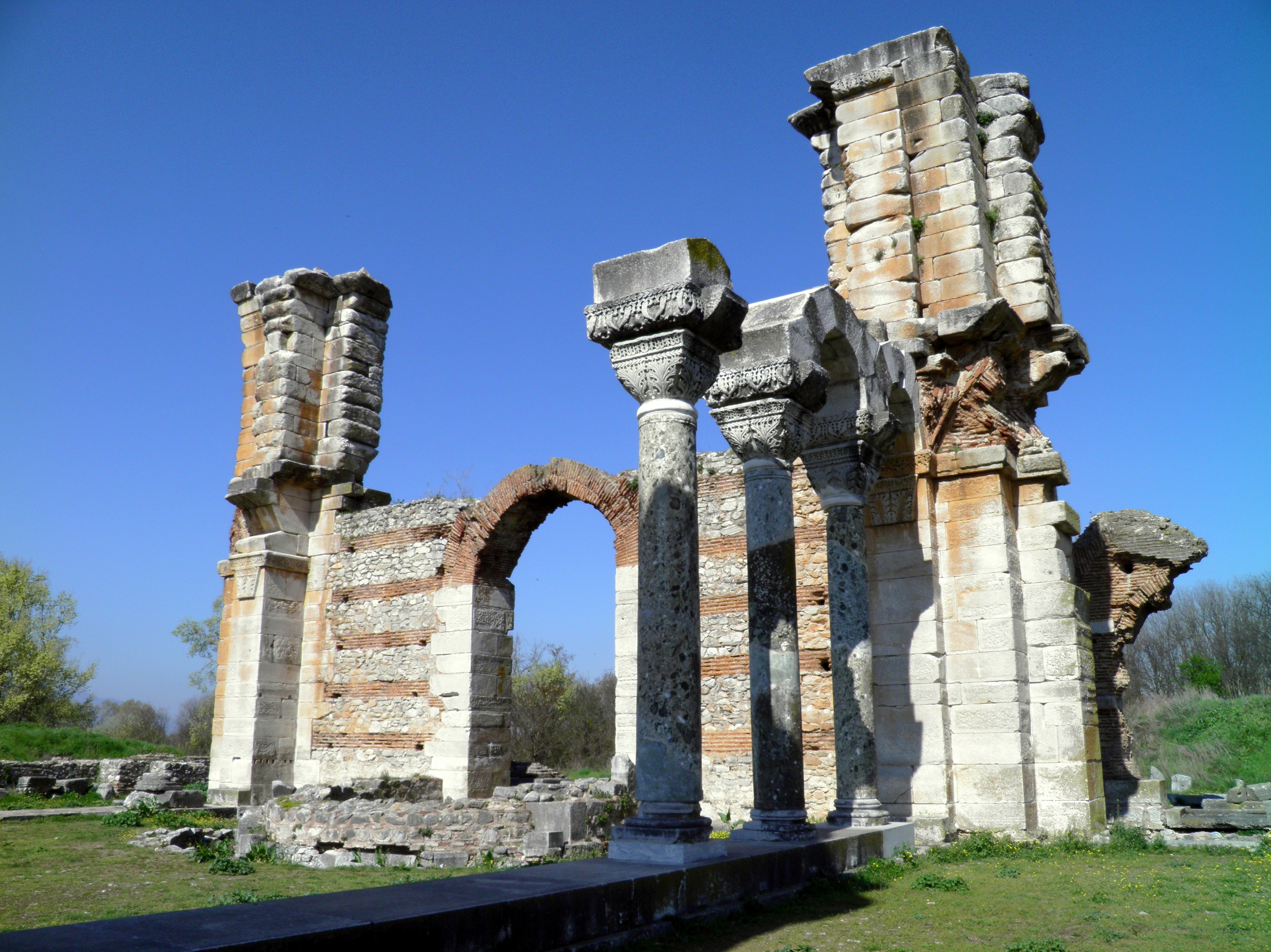
Incomplete basilica in Philippi; its construction is believed to have been halted by the plague of Justinian.

The Byzantine historian Procopius first reported the epidemic in 541 from the port of Pelusium, near Suez in Egypt. Two other first-hand reports of the plague's ravages were by the Syriac church historian John of Ephesus and by Evagrius Scholasticus, who was a child in Antioch at the time and later became a church historian. Evagrius was afflicted with the buboes associated with the disease, but survived. During the disease's four returns in his lifetime, he lost his wife, a daughter and her child, other children, most of his servants, and people from his country estate.

According to contemporary sources, the outbreak in Constantinople was thought to have been carried to the city by infected rats on grain ships arriving from Egypt. The Romans in Byzantium imported a significant amount of grain from Egypt, where rats and fleas potentially affected by Y. pestis were a significant pest control issue.

Procopius, in a passage closely modelled on Thucydides, recorded that at its peak the plague was killing 10,000 people in Constantinople daily, but the accuracy of the figure is in question, and the true number will probably never be known. He noted that because there was no room to bury the dead, bodies were left stacked in the open, funeral rites were often left unattended to, and the entire city smelled like the dead. Given such circumstances, it is highly probable that a sudden increase in mortality rates may not have been as accurately recorded, hence the overall death toll is based on an estimate.

In Procopius' Secret History, he records the devastation in the countryside and reports the ruthless response by the hard-pressed Justinian:

When pestilence swept through the whole known world and notably the Roman Empire, wiping out most of the farming community and of necessity leaving a trail of desolation in its wake, Justinian showed no mercy towards the ruined freeholders. Even then, he did not refrain from demanding the annual tax, not only the amount at which he assessed each individual, but also the amount for which his deceased neighbours were liable.

As a result of the plague in the countryside, farmers could not take care of crops and the price of grain rose in Constantinople. Justinian had expended huge amounts of money for wars against the Vandals in the region of Carthage and against the Ostrogoths' kingdom in Italy. He had invested heavily in the construction of great churches, such as Hagia Sophia. As the empire tried to fund the projects, the plague caused tax revenues to decline through the massive number of deaths and the disruption of agriculture and trade. Justinian swiftly enacted new legislation to deal more efficiently with the glut of inheritance suits being brought as a result of victims dying intestate. The Plague also had implications for the socioeconomics of the Eastern Roman Empire. During the height of the plague, Justinian would increase the tax burden on the Landowner class as they would be made responsible for the taxes of neighbouring land if it became abandoned due to the owners dying to the plague. On the other hand, the labour shortage caused by the plague drove wages higher, and papyrus documents from Egypt documented wage increases of up to 150%.

The plague's long-term effects on European and Christian history were enormous. As the disease spread to port cities around the Mediterranean, the struggling Goths were reinvigorated and their conflict with Constantinople entered a new phase. The plague weakened the Byzantine Empire at a critical point, when Justinian's armies had nearly retaken all of Italy and the western Mediterranean coast; the evolving conquest would have reunited the core of the Western Roman Empire with the Eastern Roman Empire. Although the conquest occurred in 554, the reunification did not last long. In 568, the Lombards invaded Northern Italy, defeated the small Byzantine army that had been left behind and established the Kingdom of the Lombards.

Gaul and Southern Germany are known to have suffered from the plague. Plague victims at an early Anglo-Saxon burial site at Edix Hill near Cambridge show that the plague had also reached Britain.

Archaeological evidence from Greek-language epitaphs in Byzantine Palestine and Arabia supports the traditional dating of the first outbreak to 541 CE. Scholar Nancy Benovitz also describes a notable spike in the number of Christian epitaphs in the 540s, particularly around Gaza and the Negev, which she interprets as a possible memorial response to the plague's impact. Recently, a mass grave from the casualties of the pandemic was found in Jerash, Jordan. The plague may also be documented as far south as in the southern region of the Arabian Peninsula, in Sabaic inscriptions from the Himyarite Kingdom.

Procopius said that plague sufferers experienced delusions, nightmares, fevers, swellings in the groin, armpits and behind the ears, and coma or death. Treatments included cold baths, powders "blessed" by saints, magic amulets or rings, and various drugs, especially alkaloids. When these treatments failed, people went to hospitals or tried to quarantine themselves.

=== Onset of the first plague pandemic ===
The Plague of Justinian is the first and the best known outbreak of the first plague pandemic, which continued to recur until the middle of the 8th century. Some historians believe the first plague pandemic was one of the deadliest pandemics in history, resulting in the deaths of an estimated 15 to 100 million people during two centuries of recurrence, a death toll equivalent to 25 to 60% of Europe's population at the time of the first outbreak. Research published in 2019 argued that the 200-year-long pandemic's death toll and social effects have been exaggerated, comparing it to the modern third plague pandemic (1855–1960s). Furthermore, some historians argue that the eyewitness accounts of the disease are hysterical in tone and therefore misleading.

== Epidemiology ==
=== Genetics of the Justinian plague strain ===
The plague of Justinian is generally regarded as the first historically recorded epidemic of Yersinia pestis. This conclusion is based on historical descriptions of the clinical manifestations of the disease and the detection of Y. pestis DNA from human remains at ancient grave sites dated to that period.

Genetic studies of modern and ancient Yersinia pestis DNA suggest that the origin of the Justinian plague was in Central Asia. The most basal, or root level, existing strains of the Yersinia pestis as a whole species are found in Qinghai, China. Other scholars contest that, rather than Central Asia, the specific strain that composed the Justinian plague began in sub-Saharan Africa, and that the plague was spread to the Mediterranean by merchants from the Kingdom of Aksum in East Africa. This point of origin aligns more with the general south–north spread of the disease from Egypt into the rest of the Mediterranean world. It also explains why Sassanid Persia saw a later development of the outbreak despite stronger trade links with Central Asia. After samples of DNA from Yersinia pestis were isolated from skeletons of Justinian plague victims in Germany, it was found that modern strains currently found in the Tian Shan mountain range system are most basal known in comparison with the Justinian plague strain. Additionally, a skeleton found in Tian Shan dating to around 180 AD and identified as an "early Hun" was found to contain DNA from Yersinia pestis closely related to the Tian Shan strain basal ancestor of the Justinian plague strain German samples. This finding suggests that the expansion of nomadic peoples who moved across the Eurasian steppe, such as the Xiongnu and the later Huns, had a role in spreading plague to West Eurasia from an origin in Central Asia.

Earlier samples of Yersinia pestis DNA have been found in skeletons dating from 3000 to 800 BC, across West and East Eurasia. The strain of Yersinia pestis responsible for the Black Death, the devastating pandemic of bubonic plague, does not appear to be a direct descendant of the Justinian plague strain. However, the spread of Justinian plague may have caused the evolutionary radiation that gave rise to the currently extant 0ANT.1 clade of strains.

=== Virulence and mortality rate ===
The mortality rate is uncertain and remains heavily debated. Some modern scholars believe that the plague killed up to 5,000 people per day in Constantinople at the peak of the pandemic. According to one view, the initial plague ultimately killed perhaps 40% of the city's inhabitants and caused the deaths of up to a quarter of the human population of the Eastern Mediterranean. Frequent subsequent waves of the plague continued to strike throughout the 6th, 7th and 8th centuries, with the disease becoming more localized and less virulent.

Revisionist views suggest that the mortality of the Justinian Plague was far lower than previously believed. Lee Mordechai and Merle Eisenberg argue that the plague might have caused high mortality in specific places, but it did not cause widespread demographic decline or decimate Mediterranean populations. Therefore, any direct mid-to-long term effects of plague were minor. However, Peter Sarris criticizes their methodology and source handling, and provides a discussion of the genetic evidence, including the suggestion that the plague may have entered Western Eurasia via more than one route, and perhaps struck England before Constantinople. On the other hand, Haggai Olshanetsky and Lev Cosijns reassert the view that the plague had a limited impact, as various archaeological evidence indicates there was no demographic or economic decline in the 6th century Eastern Mediterranean.

== Climate connections ==
According to 2024 research, major plagues that significantly affected the Roman Empire, such as the Antonine Plague, the Plague of Cyprian, and the Plague of Justinian, are strongly linked to periods of cooler and drier climate conditions, indicating that colder weather may have contributed to the spread of these diseases during that time. It is thought that climate stress interacted with social and biological variables, such as food availability, rodent populations, and human migration, making populations more susceptible to disease.

== See also ==
- History of plague
  - Black Plague
  - First plague pandemic
- List of epidemics
- Medieval demography
- Plague of Amwas
- Post-classical history
- Volcanic winter of 536

== Sources ==
- Arrizabalaga, Jon (2010). "Plague and epidemics". In Bjork, Robert E. (ed.). The Oxford Dictionary of the Middle Ages. Oxford University Press. doi:10.1093/acref/9780198662624.001.0001. ISBN 978-0-19-866262-4.
- Cameron, Averil (1993). The Mediterranean World in Late Antiquity AD 395-700. Routledge.
- Charles-Edwards, T. M. (2013). Wales and the Britons 350–1064. Oxford, UK: Oxford University Press. ISBN 978-0-19-821731-2.
- Cheng, Maria (January 28, 2014). "Plague DNA found in ancient teeth shows medieval Black Death, 1,500-year pandemic caused by same disease". National Post.
- Conrad, Lawrence I. (1982). "Tāʿūn and Wabāʾ: Conceptions of Plague and Pestilence in Early Islam". Journal of the Economic and Social History of the Orient. 25: 268–307.
- Damgaard, Peter de B.; et al. (May 9, 2018). "137 ancient human genomes from across the Eurasian steppes". Nature. 557 (7705): 369–374. Bibcode:2018Natur.557..369D. doi:10.1038/s41586-018-0094-2. hdl:1887/3202709. PMID 29743675. S2CID 13670282.
- Eiland, Murray (2022). "Networks of Rome, Byzantium, and China". Antiqvvs. 4 (1).
- Eisenberg, Merle; Mordechai, Lee (December 2020). "The Justinianic Plague and Global Pandemics: The Making of the Plague Concept". The American Historical Review. 125 (5): 1632–1667. doi:10.1093/ahr/rhaa510.
- Eroshenko, Galina A.; et al. (October 26, 2017). "Yersinia pestis strains of ancient phylogenetic branch 0.ANT are widely spread in the high-mountain plague foci of Kyrgyzstan". PLOS ONE. 12 (10) e0187230. Bibcode:2017PLoSO..1287230E. doi:10.1371/journal.pone.0187230. PMC 5658180. PMID 29073248.
- Evagrius. Historia Ecclesiae.
- Floor, Willem (2018). Studies in the History of Medicine in Iran. Costa Mesa, California: Mazda Publishers. ISBN 978-1-933823-94-2.
- Gârdan, Gabriel-Viorel (2020). ""The Justinianic Plague": The Effects of a Pandemic in Late Antiquity and the Early Middle Ages". Romanian Journal of Artistic Creativity. 8 (4): 3–18.
- Harbeck, Michaela; et al. (2013). Besansky, Nora J (ed.). "Yersinia pestis DNA from Skeletal Remains from the 6th Century AD Reveals Insights into Justinianic Plague". PLOS Pathogens. 9 (5) e1003349. doi:10.1371/journal.ppat.1003349. PMC 3642051. PMID 23658525.
- John of Ephesus. Ecclesiastical History, Part Two.
- Little, Lester K., ed. (2006). Plague and the End of Antiquity: The Pandemic of 541–750. Cambridge University Press. ISBN 978-0-521-84639-4.
- Maugh, Thomas. "An Empire's Epidemic". Archived from the original on 2002-08-04.
- Meier, Mischa (August 2016). "The Justinianic Plague: The economic consequences of the pandemic in the Eastern Roman empire and its cultural and religious effects". Early Medieval Europe. 24 (3): 267–292. doi:10.1111/emed.12152. S2CID 163966072.
- "Modern lab reaches across the ages to resolve plague DNA debate". phys.org. May 20, 2013.
- Moorhead, John (1994). Justinian. Routledge. ISBN 978-0-582-06303-7.
- Mordechai, Lee; Eisenberg, Merle (August 2019). "Rejecting Catastrophe: The Case of the Justinianic Plague". Past & Present (244): 3–50. doi:10.1093/pastj/gtz009.
- Mordechai, L; Eisenberg M; Newfield T; Izdebski A; Kay Janet; Poinar H. (2019). "The Justinianic Plague: An inconsequential pandemic?", PNAS https://doi.org/10.1073/pnas.1903797116.
- Morelli, Giovanna; et al. (October 31, 2010). "Yersinia pestis genome sequencing identifies patterns of global phylogenetic diversity". Nature Genetics. 42 (12): 1140–1143. doi:10.1038/ng.705. PMC 2999892. PMID 21037571.
- Procopius. Anekdota.
- Procopius (1914). History of the Wars. Loeb Library of the Greek and Roman Classics. Vol. 7 Vols. Translated by H. B. Dewing. Cambridge, Massachusetts: Harvard University Press.
- Procopius. The Plague.
- Rosen, William (2007). Justinian's Flea: Plague, Empire, and the Birth of Europe. New York: Viking Adult. ISBN 978-0-670-03855-8.
- Russell, Josiah C. (1968). "That earlier plague". Demography. 5. Ashburn, Virginia: Springer Verlag: 174–184. doi:10.1007/bf03208570. ISSN 1533-7790. S2CID 46979303.
- Sessa, Kristina (12 June 2020). "The Justinianic Plague". Origins: Current Events in Historical Perspective. Columbus, Ohio: Ohio State University, College of Arts and Sciences on behalf of the History Departments at the Ohio State University and Miami University. Archived from the original on 17 November 2020.
- Sarris, Peter (August 2002). "The Justinianic plague: origins and effects" (PDF). Continuity and Change. 17 (2). Cambridge and New York: Cambridge University Press: 171. doi:10.1017/S0268416002004137. ISSN 1469-218X. S2CID 144954310.
- Sarris, Peter (February 2022). "Viewpoint: New Approaches to the 'Plague of Justinian'". Past & Present (254). Oxford and New York: Oxford University Press on behalf of the Past and Present Society: 315–346. doi:10.1093/pastj/gtab024. ISSN 1477-464X.
- Stathakopoulos, Dionysios (2004). Famine and Pestilence in the Late Roman and Early Byzantine Empire: A Systematic Survey of Subsistence Crises and Epidemics. London and New York: Routledge. ISBN 978-0-7546-3021-0.
- Stathakopoulos, Dionysios (2018). "Plague, Justinianic (Early Medieval Pandemic)". In Nicholson, Oliver (ed.). The Oxford Dictionary of Late Antiquity. Oxford and New York: Oxford University Press. doi:10.1093/acref/9780198662778.001.0001. ISBN 978-0-19-866277-8.
- Than, Ker (31 January 2014). "Two of History's Deadliest Plagues Were Linked, With Implications for Another Outbreak". www.nationalgeographic.com. Washington, D.C.: National Geographic. ISSN 0027-9358. OCLC 643483454. Archived from the original on 30 March 2021.
- Wade, Nicholas (October 31, 2010). "Europe's Plagues Came From China, Study Finds". The New York Times. New York: The New York Times Company. ISSN 1553-8095. OCLC 1645522. Archived from the original on 4 November 2010.
- Wiechmann, I; Grupe, G (January 2005). "Detection of Yersinia pestis DNA in two early medieval skeletal finds from Aschheim (Upper Bavaria, 6th century A.D.)". American Journal of Physical Anthropology. 126 (1). New York: John Wiley & Sons on behalf of the American Association of Biological Anthropologists: 48–55. Bibcode:2005AJPA..126...48W. doi:10.1002/ajpa.10276. ISSN 1096-8644. PMID 15386257.
