= Ken Dark =

British archaeologist and academic

Kenneth Rainsbury Dark (born in Brixton, London), usually known as Ken Dark, is a British archaeologist and historian who specializes in Europe and the Middle East in the first millennium AD (especially late antiquity, the end of Roman Britain and the sub-Roman kingdoms which succeeded it, the Byzantine world, early Christianity, Roman and post-Roman urbanism, and connectivity), archaeological theory and method, and on the relationship between the study of the past and contemporary global political and cultural issues.

== Biography ==
He received a BA in archaeology from the University of York and after taking his PhD in archaeology and history at the University of Cambridge was attached to Cambridge, Oxford, Reading and King's College London. Leaving King's College London in 2025 he returned to the University of Cambridge, where he is currently based at St Edmund's College and is also a Fellow of the McDonald Institute for Archaeological Research and a Visiting Professor at the Institute of Orthodox Christian Studies. At the University of Reading he became Professor of Archaeology and History and was director of the Research Centre for Late Antique and Byzantine Studies, and has continued to hold a professorial title since that time.

He holds honorary professorships from several European and American universities, has written 16 books and many academic articles, and has directed and co-directed excavations and survey projects, both in Britain, including at Tintagel in Cornwall and at St Augustine's Abbey at Canterbury in Kent – and the Middle East, including in Istanbul (Turkey) – where between 1997 and 2018 he co-directed both a rescue archaeology project on the Roman and Byzantine capital city and an archaeological study of the Byzantine church of Hagia Sophia and its environs – and on the Roman and Byzantine periods in and around Nazareth (Israel) and on the shores of the Sea of Galilee. His research in the Middle East, Britain and elsewhere has been the subject of extensive international media attention since 2015.

He is a fellow of the Society of Antiquaries of London, the Society of Antiquaries of Scotland, the Royal Historical Society, the Royal Anthropological Institute of Great Britain and Ireland, and a member of the Royal Institute of International Affairs and the Royal Society of Antiquaries of Ireland, the only person ever to be elected to all of these learned societies.

== See also ==
- Sisters of Nazareth Convent from Nazareth

== Works ==
=== Selected bibliography ===
- Dark, Ken (2026). Tyrants and Traders.Tintagel, Arthur and the Lost Kings. Bloomsbury Academic. ISBN 9781350519411.
- Dark, Ken (2023). Archaeology of Jesus' Nazareth. Oxford University Press. ISBN 9780192865397.
- Dark, Ken; Kostenec, Jan (2023). Hagia Sophia in Context: An Archaeological Re-examination of the Cathedral of Byzantine Constantinople. Oxbow Books. ISBN 9781789259872.
- Dark, Ken; Özgümüş, Ferudun (2022). Constantinople: Archaeology of a Byzantine Megapolis. Oxbow Books. ISBN 9781789258066.
- Dark, Ken (2021). The Sisters of Nazareth Convent: a Roman-period, Byzantine and Crusader site in central Nazareth. Routledge. ISBN 9780367542191.
- Dark, Ken (2021). Roman-period and Byzantine Nazareth and its Hinterland. Routledge. ISBN 9780367408237.
- Dark, Ken (2018). The Waves of Time: Long-term Change and International Relations. Bloomsbury Publishing. ISBN 9781474288309.
- Dark, Ken (2001). Byzantine Pottery. Tempus. ISBN 9780752419428.
- Dark, Ken (2000). Britain and the End of the Roman Empire. Tempus. ISBN 9780752414515.

=== Selected academic papers ===
- "The earliest English church? The Chapel of St Pancras at St Augustine’s Abbey, Canterbury, reconsidered", Journal of the British Archaeological Association 175, 2022, 13-36
- "Royal burial in fifth–to seventh–century western Britain and Ireland", Journal of the Royal Society of Antiquaries of Ireland 150, 2021 (for 2020), 21-40
- "Returning to the Caves of Mystery: texts, archaeology and the origins of Christian topography and pilgrimage in the Holy Land", Royal Anthropological Institute Henry Myers Lecture, Strata 38, 2020,103-124.
- "Stones of the saints? Inscribed stones, monasticism and the evangelisation of western and northern Britain in the fifth and sixth centuries", The Journal of Ecclesiastical History 72, 2021, 239-58

== Other sources ==
- Ken Dark: Nazareth Archaeology Project 2007. Field Work, Travel, and Research Reports: Byzantium.
- Ken Dark. Contemporary Authors: A Bio-Bibliographical Guide to Current Writers in Fiction, General Nonfiction, Poetry, Journalism, Drama, Motion Pictures, Television, and Other fields (Thomson Gale: 2008)
- "Professor Ken Dark -The Conversation
- "Professor Ken Dark'
- "Professor Ken Dark"
