= Contrayerva =

Medicinal root of Central/South American herb plants

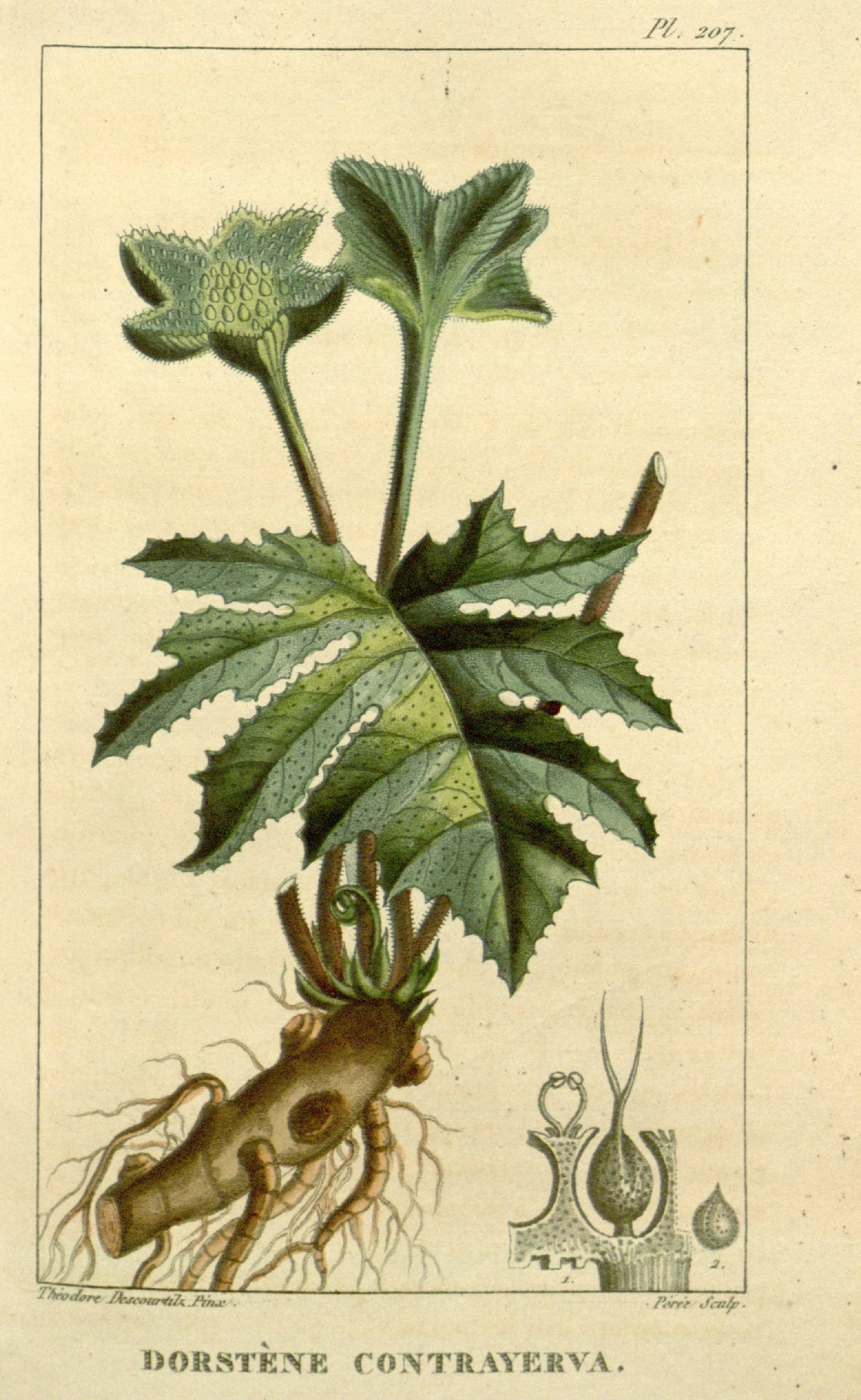
Dorstenia contrajerva, a source for contrayerva.

Contrayerva, or contrajerva, is the medicinal rhizome of various tropical Central American and South American species of Dorstenia in the family Moraceae, mainly Dorstenia contrajerva and the closely related Dorstenia drakena but also Dorstenia brasiliensis. The word contrayerva means “counter herb” in Spanish. It was given this name since a 16th-century description (see below) claimed that the leaves of a herb (yerva = hierba) were used by South American Indians to counter the deadly poisonous effect of the same herb (“contra yerva”) when used as an arrow poison. Seventeenth-century herbalists and botanists identified this herb as the aromatic root that had been brought from Peru to England by Francis Drake, and claimed that it was an antidote against all kinds of poison. By the late 18th century contrayerva had lost its reputation as an antidote, but it continued to be listed in European and American pharmacopoeias and herbals until the 1920s as a gentle stimulant, tonic and diaphoretic. It is still used in folk medicine in Central and South America.

== Description of the contrayerva root ==
In the entry "Contra-yerva" in Chambers’ Cyclopedia of 1728, it is said that the root is smaller than that of the iris, reddish outside and white inside, knotty, and fibrous. To be of use, it must be new, heavy, and of a dusky red color. Its odor resembles that of fig leaves. Its taste is aromatic, accompanied with some acrimony.

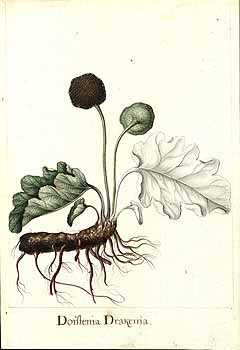
Dorstenia drakena

William Woodville wrote in Medical Botany: "The root of Contrayerva has a peculiar kind of aromatic smell, and a light astringent warm bitterish taste, and on being long chewed it discovers somewhat of a sweetish sharpness. According to Lewis, 'Contrayerva root gives out its virtue, by the assistance of heat, both to water and rectified spirit, and tinges the former of a dark brownish red, the latter of a brighter reddish colour: the watery decoction is very mucilaginous, so as not to pass through a filter.' [Lewis Mat. Med.]"

The Dispensatory of the United States of America (1918) describes the root, as found in commerce, as oblong, 5–7.5 cm (2.0–3.0 in) long, of varying thickness, very hard, rough, and solid, of a reddish-brown color externally, and pale within; and has numerous, long, slender, yellowish rootlets attached to its inferior part. The odor is aromatic; the taste warm, slightly bitter, and pungent. The sensible properties are extracted by alcohol and boiling water. The decoction is highly mucilaginous. The tincture reddens infusion of litmus, and precipitates on the addition of water.

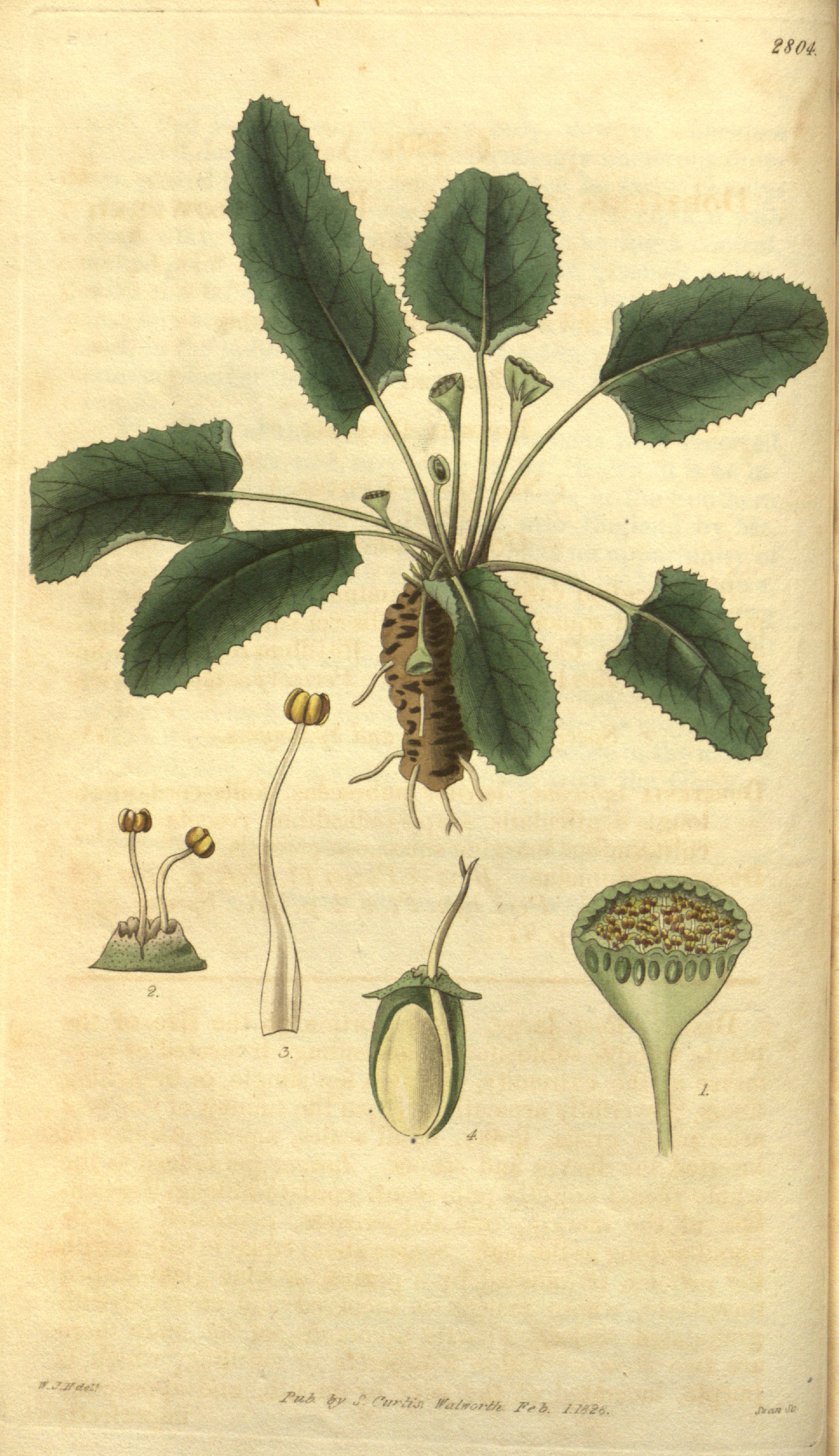
Dorstenia brasiliensis

== Origin of the contrayerva root ==
The official contrayerva root or radix contrayervae in 18th century English medical literature was Dorstenia contrajerva, but the roots of other Dorstenia species such as the closely related Dorstenia drakenaand Dorstenia brasiliensis were also often collected and sold. The 18th century physician and botanist William Woodville wrote: “upon the faith of Dr. Houston, who examined the Contrayerva plants in their native soil, we should otherwise have had no doubt in referring the official radix contrayervae to the species (i.e. Dorstenia contrajerva) he has described, as has been done by Bergius and Murray. But as Houston has observed, that the roots of different species of Dorstenia are promiscuously gathered and exported for those of the Contrayerva; and as all the species bear a great resemblance to each other, we conceive the further discussion of this subject to be of no material consequence.” The 19th century English pharmacologist Jonathan Pereira wrote in his Elements of Materia Medica that the Contrayerva root “usually met in the shops” is not Dorstenia contrajerva but Dorstenia brasiliensis—“A native of Jamaica, Brazil, and Trinidad.”

The first mention of contrayerva is found in Nicolás Monardes Historia medicinal de las cosas que se traen de nuestras Indias Occidentales, 1580. In this work Monardes reproduced a letter by an informant in Peru, the Spaniard Pedro de Osma y de Xara y Zejo, who writes that he has been informed by his soldier cousin that the leaves of a herb (“yerua” = yerva = hierba) with broad leaves resembling those of the plantain are used as by the native Indians as a counter herb (“contra yerua”) against injuries caused by arrows poisoned with the deadly poison made from this same poisonous herb (“una yerua, que es contra yerua”). There is no mention of the root in the letter and book nor any recipes.

A report recorded by Hans Sloane in the early 18th century describes the manner the Spanish in America are said to have discovered the use of the contrayerva: When a Spaniard was injured by a poison arrow shot by an Indian, the Spaniards threatened to injure one of their Indian prisoners with a poisoned arrow unless he revealed the cure. Thereupon the “Indian immediately chaw'd some of this Contra Yerva, and put it into the wound, and it healed.”

Carolus Clusius described the root twice in his Exoticorum libri decem (1605), without making a link between the two. First he describes it as the Drakena radix and later on, in a translation from a Spanish work by Monardus or Nicolás Monardes, as contrayerva,

The English herbalist Thomas Johnson linked the two roots (1633): “That root which of late is known in some shops by the Spanish name Contra-yerva is the same which Clusius hath set forth by the title of Drakena radix wherfore I will give you the histoorie of Clusius and thereto adde that which Monardus writes of the Contra-yerva. For although Bauhine and the Author of the Historia Lugdunensis seeme to make these different yet I finde that both Clusius his figure and historie exactly agree with the roots sent us from Spaine by that title. Wherefore I shall make them one till some shal shew me how they differ ...”

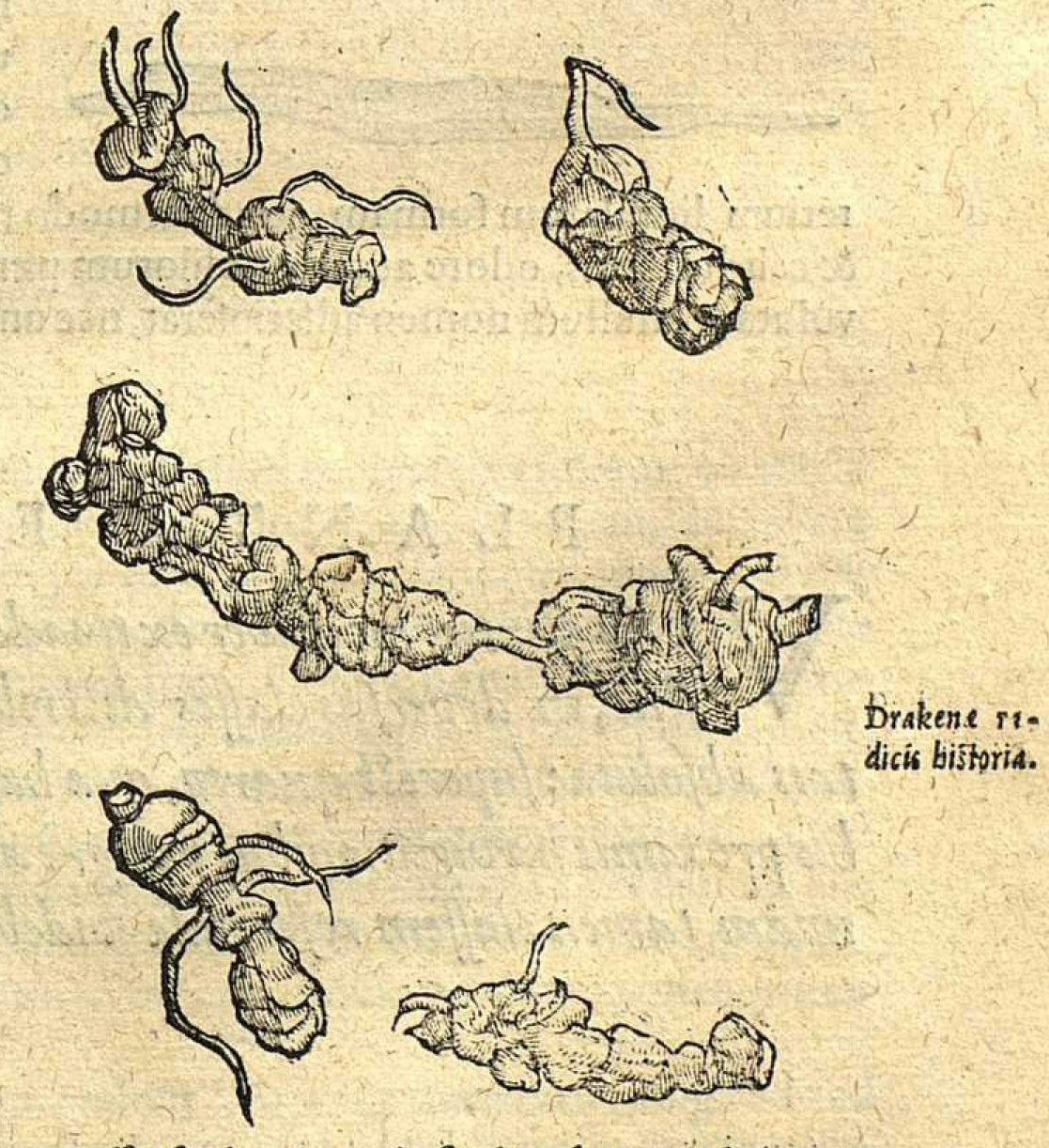
Drakena radix by Clusius.

Johnson continues by giving translations from Clusius' Exoticorum libri decem: “...Sr Francis Drake gave me at London certain roots ... hee had brought with him affirming them to be of high esteem amongst the Peruvians. ... N. Eliot (= Lawrence Eliot ) who accompanied Francis Drake in that voyage, said that the Spaniards in Peru had them in great request and they could not easily be got of them, and that be had learned by them that the leaves were present poison, but the root an antidote, and that not only against the same poison but also against other; and that it strengthned the heart and vitall faculties, if it were beaten to pouder and taken in the morning in a little wine and given in water it mitigated the heate of Peuers (= fevers). By reason of these faculties it should much agree with the Radix Contra-yerva whereof Monardus writes in the same booke. Thus much Clusius. From Charchis a province of Peru (saith Monard.) are brought certain roots very like the roots of Iris but lesse, and having the smell of Fig leaves. The Spaniards that live in the Indies cal them Contra-yerva, as if you should say an antidote against poison because the pouder of them taken in white wine is a most present remedie against all poison of what kinde soever it be (only sublimate excepted, whose malignity is only extinguished by the drinking of milk) it causes them to be cast up by vomit or evacuated by sweat. They also say that Philtres or amorous potions are cast forth by drinking this pouder. It also killeth wormes in the belly. The root chewed hath a certain aromatick taste ioyned with acrimony, wherfore it seems hot in the second degree. Thus far Monardus.”

Seventeenth century medical and botanical writers were confused about the identity of the root, with Gaspard Bauhin or Bauhinus misidentifying the Contrayerva and Radix Drakena as the root of a Cyperus sedge, and others misidentifying it with the Mexican Coanenepilli, a Passionflower vine, described by the Spanish naturalist and physician Francisco Hernández de Toledo.

== Chemical constituents ==
The United States Pharmacopoeia and the National Formulary (1927) says that the root of Dorstenia contrajerva contains contrayerbine, cajapine, volatile oil, resin, a bitter principle, and starch. A 2016 study isolated the following 11 compounds from Dorstenia contrajerva: dorsjervin A, dorsjervin B, psoralen, dorstenin, squalene, γ-sitosterol, cycloartocarpesin, 1-O-linolenoyl-2-O-stearoyl-3-O-β-D-galactopyranosyl glycerol, bergapten, dorsteniol, and xanthoarnol.

The cardenolide syriogenin has also been isolated in the root of D. contrajerva.

In roots of Dorstenia species that are used in Brazilian folk medicine, furocoumarins were identified as the most abundant compounds.

== Medicinal uses ==
In folk medicine in Honduras the boiled root of Dorstenia contrajerva is used to cure diarrhea, dysentery, and stomach ache. The slightly roasted and ground root is used to treat intestinal worms and parasites. The crushed root is mixed with water to treat the bites of snakes. In Nicaragua the boiled root is used to prevent diarrhea; minced raw rhizomes are used to treat diarrhea, sickness, upset stomach, indigestion, and worms. In El Salvador it is used for stomachache and to prevent vomiting. In Costa Rica the boiled root is used in curing diarrhea, and an infusion to lower fever. It is considered useful in curing persistent diarrhea as well as an emmenagogue. In Mexico the latex is used to heal wounds and the inflorescences are given to teething children. In the Amazon region of Peru it is used as a tonic, against gangrene, and as an antidote for bee and wasp stings. In Argentina, the whole plant is used to treat snakebite. In Venezuela it is used as a sudorific and as a cure for dysentery.

Duke's Handbook of Medicinal Plants of Latin America lists the following medicinal activities of Dorstenia contrajerva: alexiteric, anti-HIV, diaphoretic, diuretic, emmenagogue, febrifuge, leishmanicide, orexigenic, stimulant, tonic.

The Dispensatory of the United States of 1918 and United States Pharmacopoeia and the National Formulary of 1927 says that contrayerva has been used for low fevers, typhoid, diarrhea, dysentery, and other diseases that require stimulation; in the form of a decoction or tincture. Maud Grieve said in her Modern Herbal (1931) that Contrayerva given as a powder or decoction is a stimulant, tonic, and diaphoretic”

The traditional topical utilization of Dorstenia rhizome preparations in the treatment of skin diseases is supported by the identification of Furocoumarins as the most abundant compounds in the roots of [Dorstenia] species used in Brazilian folk medicine.

The first description of the plant, root and its medical usage in Mexico is said to have been made by the Spanish naturalist and physician Francisco Hernández de Toledo in the 16th century: “The herb called Tozpàtli has a round root about the size of a hazelnut, with thin fibrous roots, and of an azure color, from which are born delicate petioles, on which are curved leaves, almost similar to those of the Polypodium, but smaller and more green. It is said that it carries no flower at all. It grows in high and flat, but hot places. The root is sharp and fragrant to taste, hot and dry almost in the fourth degree, and of subtle parts. This herb cures rashes/eruptions (empeynes), boils, whitlow, and also the so-called French illness (mal frances = syphilis), and clears up tumors and abscesses. The root applied externally or taken by the mouth alleviates many diseases that can be easily understood using the Method ... considering the qualities and properties described (above). Finally, this is an important and noteworthy plant, without which our apothecaries cannot do without, and so those who spend in them.” .

Carolus Clusius describes it as an antidote, emetic, expectorant, anti-philtre, and vermicide: “the pouder of them taken in white wine is a most present remedie against all poison of what kinde soever it be (only sublimate excepted, whose malignity is only extinguished by the drinking of milk) it causes them to be cast up by vomit or evacuated by sweat. They also say that Philtres or amorous potions are cast forth by drinking this pouder. It also killeth wormes in the belly.”

The entry Contra-yerva in Chambers’ Cyclopedia of 1728, states that the root “brought from Peru” is “esteem'd an Alexiterial, and a sovereign Antidote against Poison.” It also says that the root and the recipe Lapis Contrayerva (see below) are of great efficacy in smallpox, measles, fevers and in “all Cases where either a Diaphoresis or Perspiration is required.”

This Cyclopedia emphasizes its use as an anti-epidemic: “It is agreed on, by the generality of Writers, that the Contra-yerva Root is one of the best Anti-epidemics yet known. Dr. Hodges, in his treatise of laft London-Plague (= Great Plague of London), has a Receipt (= recipe) which he said was attended with great success, and of which this Root was one of the chief ingredients.” The recipe of Dr. Hodges is called Lapis Contrayerva and is given in his treatise Loimologia of 1672.

By the late 18th century contrayerva has lost its reputation as an antidote in the UK. The 18th century physician and botanist William Woodville wrote: “The antipoisonous virtues formerly attributed to this root, have been long very justly exploded as entirely chimerical, so that it is now merely employed as a diaphoretic of a moderately stimulant kind, being possessed of less pungency than any other of those medicines usually denominated alexipharmic. Putrid and nervous fevers are the diseases in which Contrayerva is chiefly used ...”

Rees's Cyclopedia of 1819 gives a recipe: “Powder of Contrayerva, Compound, is prepared by mixing five ounces of contrayerva root powdered with a pound and a half of prepared shells. This powder is stimulant and sudorific; and is given with advantage in typhoid fevers, the malignant exanthemata, the sinking stage of dysentery; and in atonic gout. The dose is from grs. x to grs. xl, given either diffused in simple water, or rubbed up with mucilage and mint water.”

The 18th–19th century Spanish Mexican physician and botanist Vicente Cervantes describes Dorstenia contrayerva as: "a plant with an aromatic smell, an acrid taste, somewhat bitter and persistent. Its virtue is stimulating, tonic and diaphoretic, it is recommended in putrid or adynamic fevers."

== Substitutes ==
In Jamaica the word contrayerva refers to the roots of species of Birthwort or Dutchman's Pipe (Aristolochia) that are considered to have antidotal and other properties similar to Dorstenia. “Spanish Contrayerva” instead is the name given to the roots of Dorstenia.

Chambers’ Cyclopedia mentions another kind of contrayerva brought from Virginia called “Viperìne”, with the same success against poisons and venoms as the “Contaryerva of Peru”. This refers to Viperina virginiana or Contrayerva virginiana, which are old names for Asarum virginicum or Virginia wild ginger. In the entry Contrayerva in Rees's Cyclopedia of 1819 this Contrayerva is said to be more ordinarily called Serpentaria and to be an excellent substitute for contrayerva.
