= Edward Archer =

Edward Archer may refer to:

- Edward Archer (politician) (1871–1940), Australian politician
- Edward Archer (physician) (1718–1789), English doctor associated with inoculation against smallpox
- Special Ed (Edward Archer, born 1973), American hip hop musician
- Ed Archer, musician in Fifth Angel
- Edward Archer, High Sheriff of Cornwall in 1794
- Edward Archer, perpetrator of the shooting of Jesse Hartnett

== See also ==
- Ted Archer (disambiguation)
