= Ted Archer =

Ted Archer may refer to:

- Nello Rossati (1942–2009), Italian director, sometimes credited as Ted Archer
- Ted Archer, character in The Age of Innocence (1993 film)

== See also ==
- Edward Archer (disambiguation)
