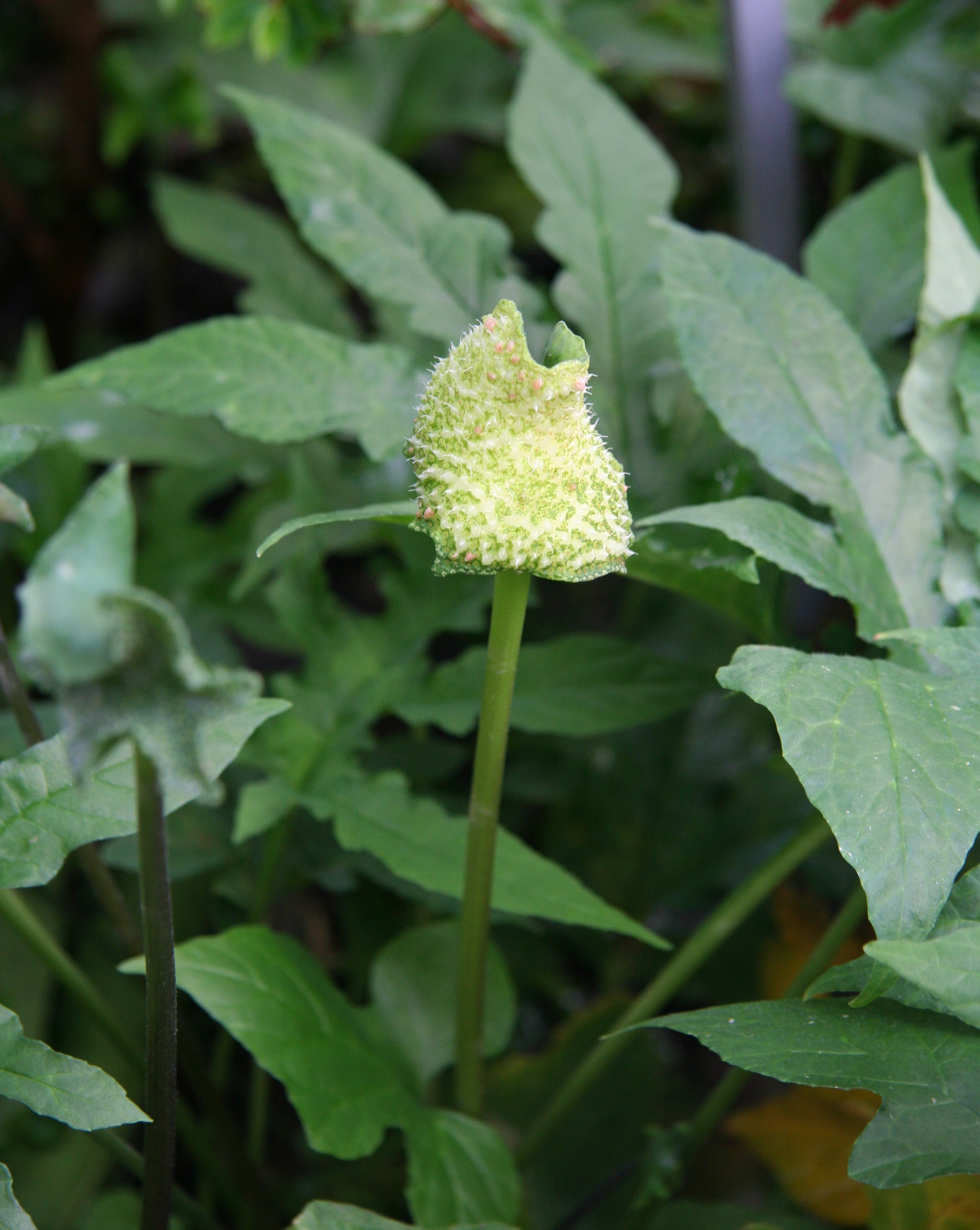

Scientific classification
- Kingdom: Plantae
- Clade: Embryophytes
- Clade: Tracheophytes
- Clade: Spermatophytes
- Clade: Angiosperms
- Clade: Eudicots
- Clade: Rosids
- Order: Rosales
- Family: Moraceae
- Genus: Dorstenia
- Species: D. contrajerva

Binomial name
- Dorstenia contrajerva L.

Synonyms
- Dorstenia contrajerva L. var. houstonii L. Dorstenia houstonii (L.) L. Dorstenia quadrangularis Stokes; Dorstenia alexiteria L. Dorstenia quadrangularis Stokes var. sinuata Stokes; Dorstenia quadrangularis Stokes var. pinnatifida Stokes; Dorstenia palmata Willd. ex Schult. Dorstenia maculata Lem. Dorstenia contrajerva L. subsp. tenuiloba S.F.Blake

= Dorstenia contrajerva =

Species of plant

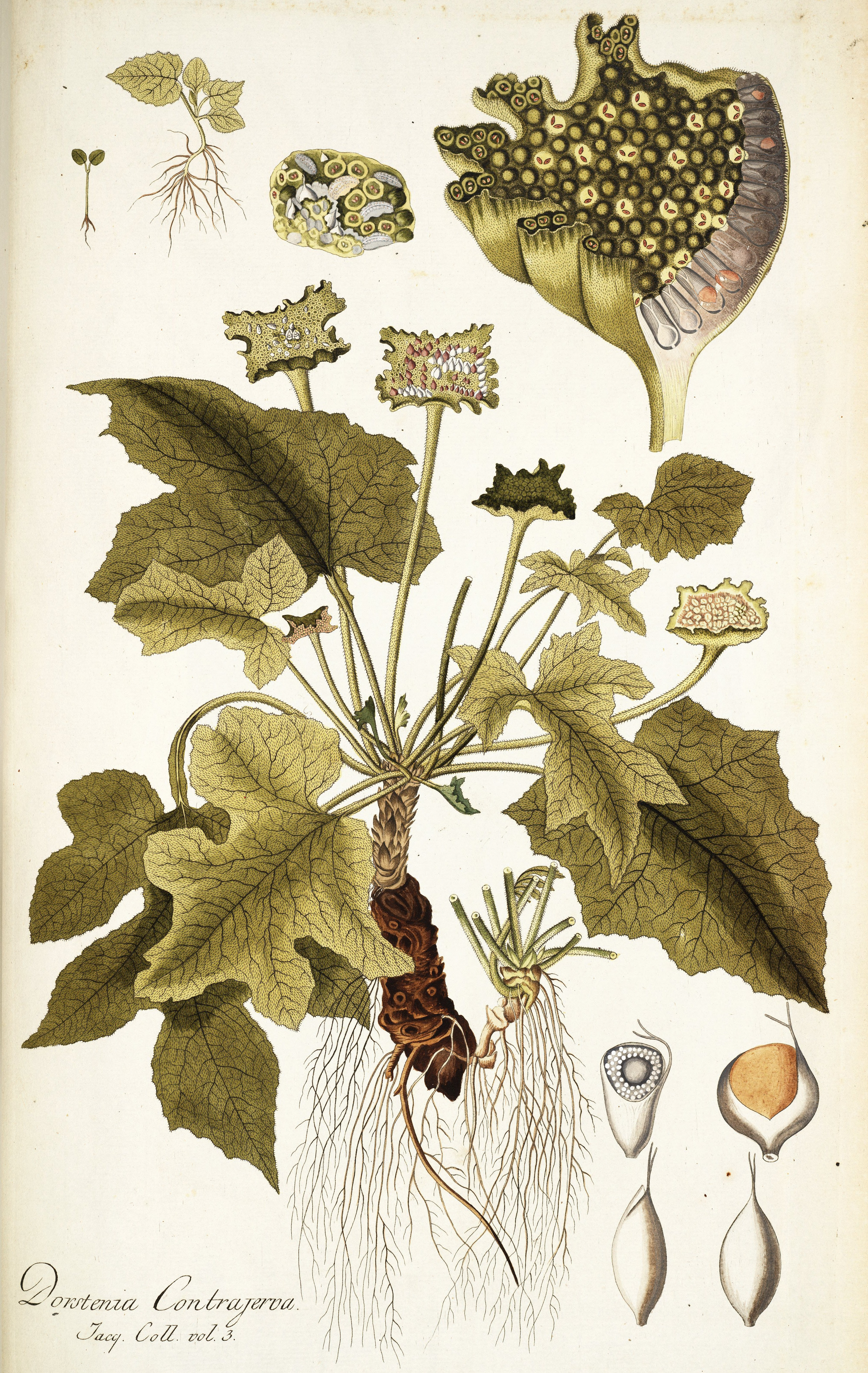
Dorstenia contrajerva, by von Jacquin, 1793.

Dorstenia contrajerva is a plant species in the family Moraceae. It is native to northern South America and Central America, and is cultivated elsewhere. The species name "contrajerva" is the Latinized form of the plant's Spanish name, "contrahierba", a name for plants used for treating poisoning and venomous bites and stings, and for which its rootstocks are used in folk medicine (as contrayerva). It is the type species of the Dorstenia genus and was first described by Carl Linnaeus in 1753.

== Description ==
Dorstenia contrajerva is a small evergreen perennial plant with a creeping rhizome from which emerges a rosette of leaves with long petioles. Leaves are variably shaped, with plants with lobed and unlobed leaves co-occurring in the same populations. Leaves are up to 20 cm long on petioles up to 25 cm long. When damaged the plant exudes a white latex. Tiny male and female flowers are distributed intermixed on a discoid receptacle of convoluted shape. The fruits are small and contained in a quadrangular container. The tiny seeds are explosively expelled.

Plants acaulescent or nearly so. The stems, if any, are very short and covered with persistent petiole bases. Leaves are often very numerous and crowded. Stipules persistent; petiole 8–25 cm. Leaf blade long-petiolate, oblong-ovate, deltate-ovate, or orbiculate, entire or deeply pinnately or almost palmately lobed, 6-20 × 7–22 cm, sparsely scabrous or pubescent. The lobes acute to acuminate, narrow or broad. Inflorescences: receptacle flat, curved, or undulate, quadrangular or irregularly lobed, accrescent in age and 2–5 cm. wide, scaberulous beneath. On long slender peduncle, 7–25 cm. Drupes somewhat globose, 0.25–1 cm in diameter. Seeds yellowish. 2 n = 30.

In the United States Pharmacopoeia and the National Formulary (1927), the rhizome of Dorstenia contrajerva or Contrayera is described as fusiform, 1–2 headed, 5–7.5 cm long, 12 mm thick, reddish, with an unpleasant odor and acrid, bitter taste.

== Distribution ==
Dorstenia contrajerva is native to southern Mexico, Central America, the Caribbean and northern South America including Peru. It is cultivated in Indonesia (Java) and Malaysia (Malacca), and locally in Africa and South America. In North America Dorstenia contrajerva has been introduced to Florida and is a weed in greenhouses and nurseries. It is sometimes cultivated as a house plant.

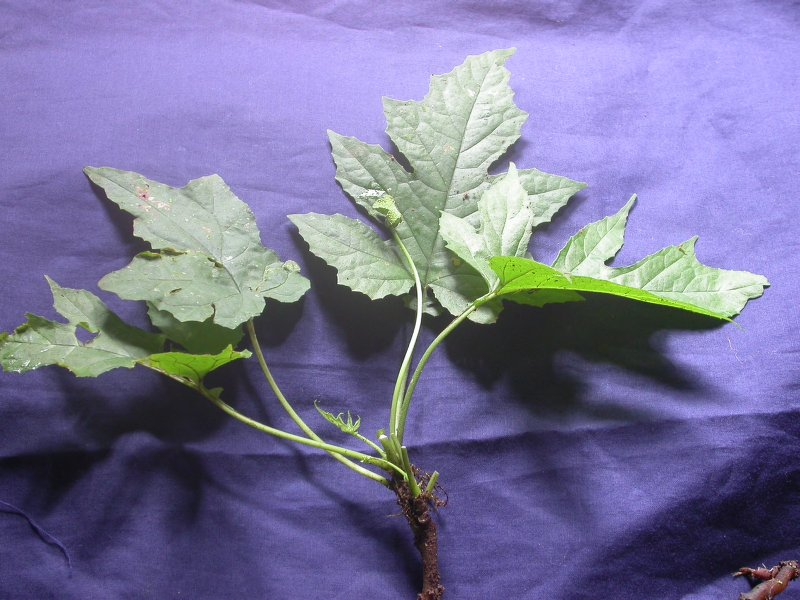
Dorstenia contrajerva

== Habitat ==
It grows in shady places in disturbed vegetation in mangroves, savannahs, thickets, and tropical forests.

== Cultivation ==
Dorstenia contrajerva requires part to full shade and a rich soil that should be kept moist but not saturated. Fertilize weekly using a balanced fertilizer diluted to half of the recommended strength. It can become very weedy if the old receptacles are not picked off. The seeds are very viable and germinate on any soil. Repotting can be done at any time of the year. Easily propagated from seed or by division. Fresh seed will germinate in 7 to 14 days.

== Use in traditional medicine ==
In folk medicine in Honduras, the boiled root is used for diarrhea, dysentery, and stomach ache. The slightly roasted and ground root is used to treat intestinal worms and parasites. The crushed root is mixed with water to treat the bites of snakes. In Nicaragua the boiled root is used to prevent diarrhea; minced raw rhizomes are used to treat diarrhea, sickness, stomach upset, indigestion, and worms. In El Salvador it is used for stomachache and to prevent vomiting. In Costa Rica the boiled root is used for diarrhea, and an infusion to lower fever. It is considered useful for diarrhea as well as an emmenagogue. In Mexico the latex is used to heal wounds and the inflorescences are given to teething children. In the Amazon region of Peru it is used as a tonic, against gangrene, and as an antidote for bee and wasp stings. In Argentina, the whole plant is used to treat snakebite. In Venezuela it is used as a sudorific and as a cure for dysentery.

Duke's Handbook of Medicinal Plants of Latin America lists the following medicinal activities: alexiteric, anti-HIV, diaphoretic, diuretic, emmenaggogue, febrifuge, leihmanicide, orexigenic, stimulant, tonic.

The United States Pharmacopoeia and the National Formulary of 1927 says that the root of this plant was used for low fevers, typhoid, diarrhea, dysentery, serpent bites; in decoction, tincture. Maud Grieve writes in her Modern Herbal (1931) that contrayerva given as a powder or decoction is a “Stimulant, tonic, and diaphoretic; given in cases of low fevers, typhoid, dysentery, diarrhoea, and other illnesses needing a stimulant.” In folk medicine it is used to treat bites of poisonous animals.

The first description of this plant and its medical usage in Mexico is said to have been made by the Spanish naturalist and physician Francisco Hernández de Toledo in the 16th century: “The herb called Tozpàtli has a round root about the size of a hazelnut, with thin fibrous roots, and of an azure color, from which are born delicate petioles, on which are curved leaves, almost similar to those of the Polypodium, but smaller and more green. It is said that it carries no flower at all. It grows in high and flat, but hot places. The root is sharp and fragrant to taste, hot and dry almost in the fourth degree, and of subtle parts. This herb cures rashes/eruptions (empeynes), boils, whitlow, and also the so-called French illness (mal frances = syphilis), and clears up tumors and abscesses. The root applied externally or taken by the mouth alleviates many diseases that can be easily understood using the Method … considering the qualities and properties described (above). Finally, this is an important and noteworthy plant, without which our apothecaries cannot do without, and so those who spend in them.” .

In the entry “Contra-yerva” in Chambers Cyclopedia of 1728, it is said that its root “brought from Peru” is “esteem'd an Alexiterial, and a sovereign Antidote against Poison.” It also says that the root and the recipe Lapis Contrayerva (see below) are of great efficacy in smallpox, measles, fevers and in “all Cases where either a Diaphoresis or Perspiration is required.”

The 18th–19th century Spanish Mexican physician and botanist Vicente Cervantes describes it as: "a plant with an aromatic smell, an acrid taste, somewhat bitter and persistent. Its virtue is stimulating, tonic and diaphoretic, it is recommended in putrid or adynamic fevers."

== Other uses ==
In North America powder made from the rootstocks and leaves is mixed with tobacco for improving the taste of cigarettes.

== Chemical constituents ==
The United States Pharmacopoeia and the National Formulary (1927) states that the root of Dorstenia contrajerva contains contrayerbine (contrajervin, a peptide), cajapine, volatile oil, resin, a bitter principle, and starch. A 2016 study isolated the following 11 compounds from Dorstenia contrajerva: dorsjervin A, dorsjervin B, psoralen, dorstenin, squalene, γ-sitosterol, cycloartocarpesin, 1-O-linolenoyl-2-O-stearoyl-3-O-ß-D-galactopyranosyl glycerol, bergapten, dorsteniol, and xanthoarnol. The cardenolide syriogenin was isolated from the root.

== Vernacular names ==
- English: snakewort, tusilla
- French: herbe aux serpents, racine de charchis
- German: bezoarwurz, schlangenwurz
- Spanish: contra de cobra, contrahierba, barbudilla (Mexico), hierba de sapo, higuerilla (Argentina), mano de leon (Venezuela)
- Nahuatl: tozpatli, tuzpatli

== Pictures ==
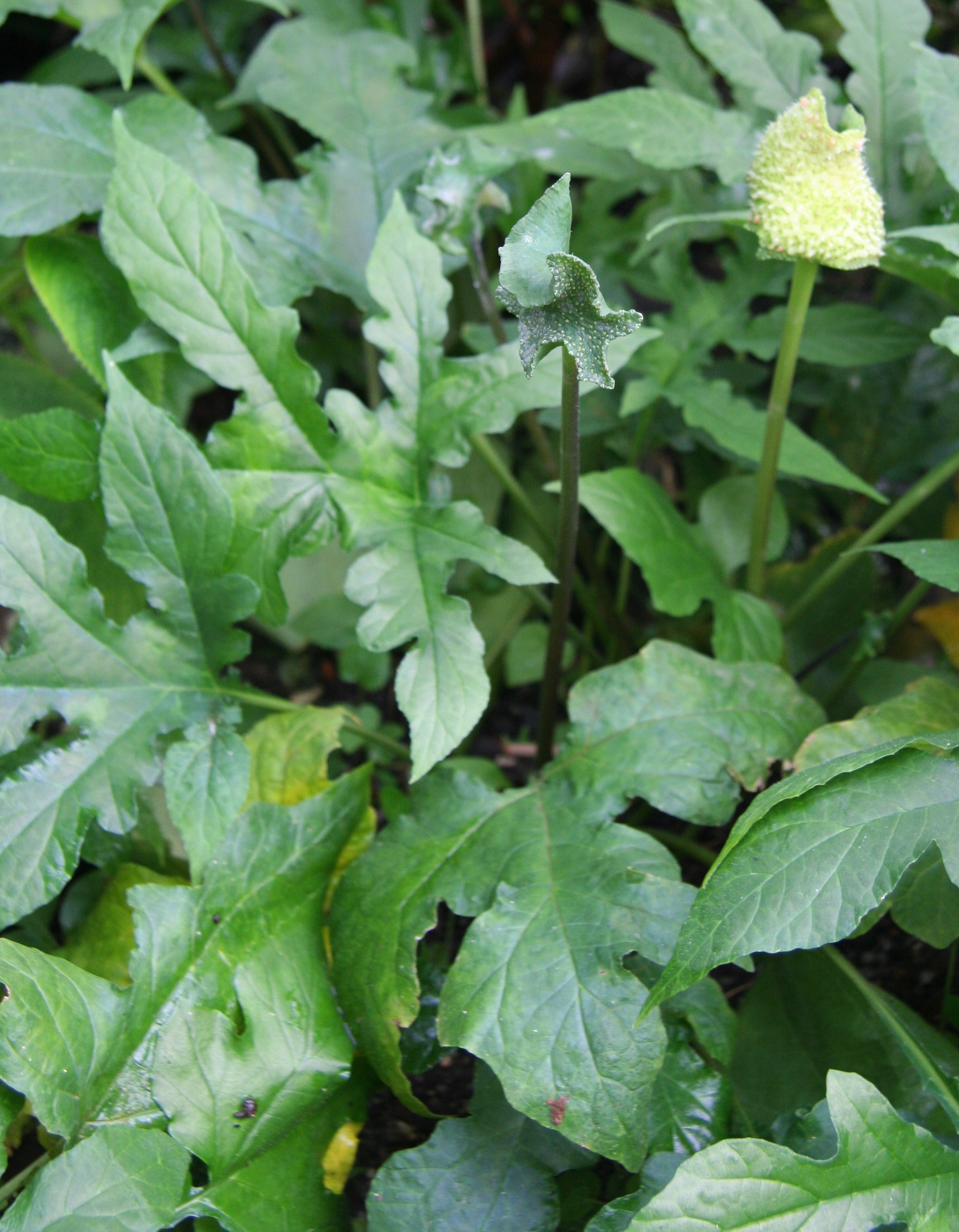

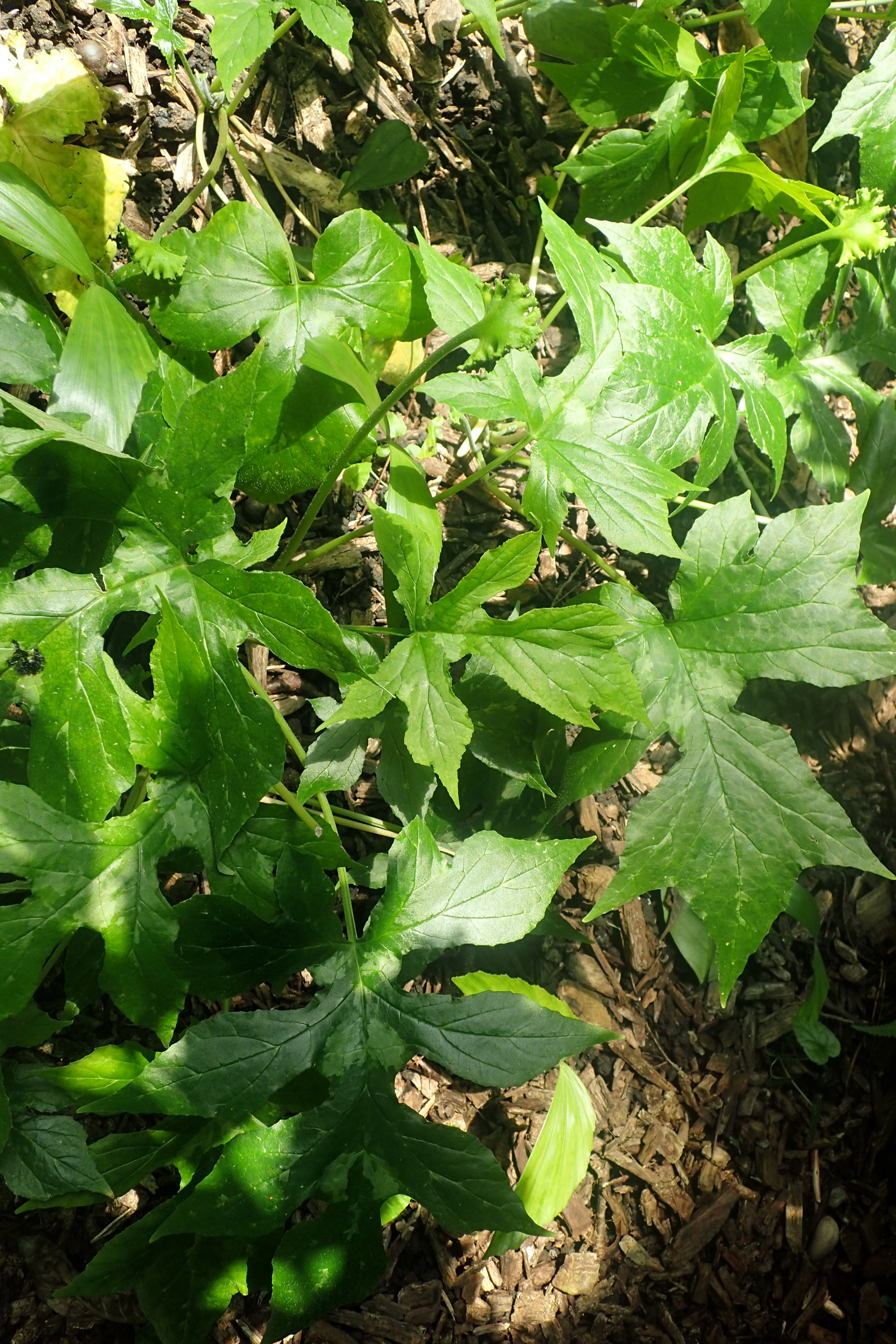

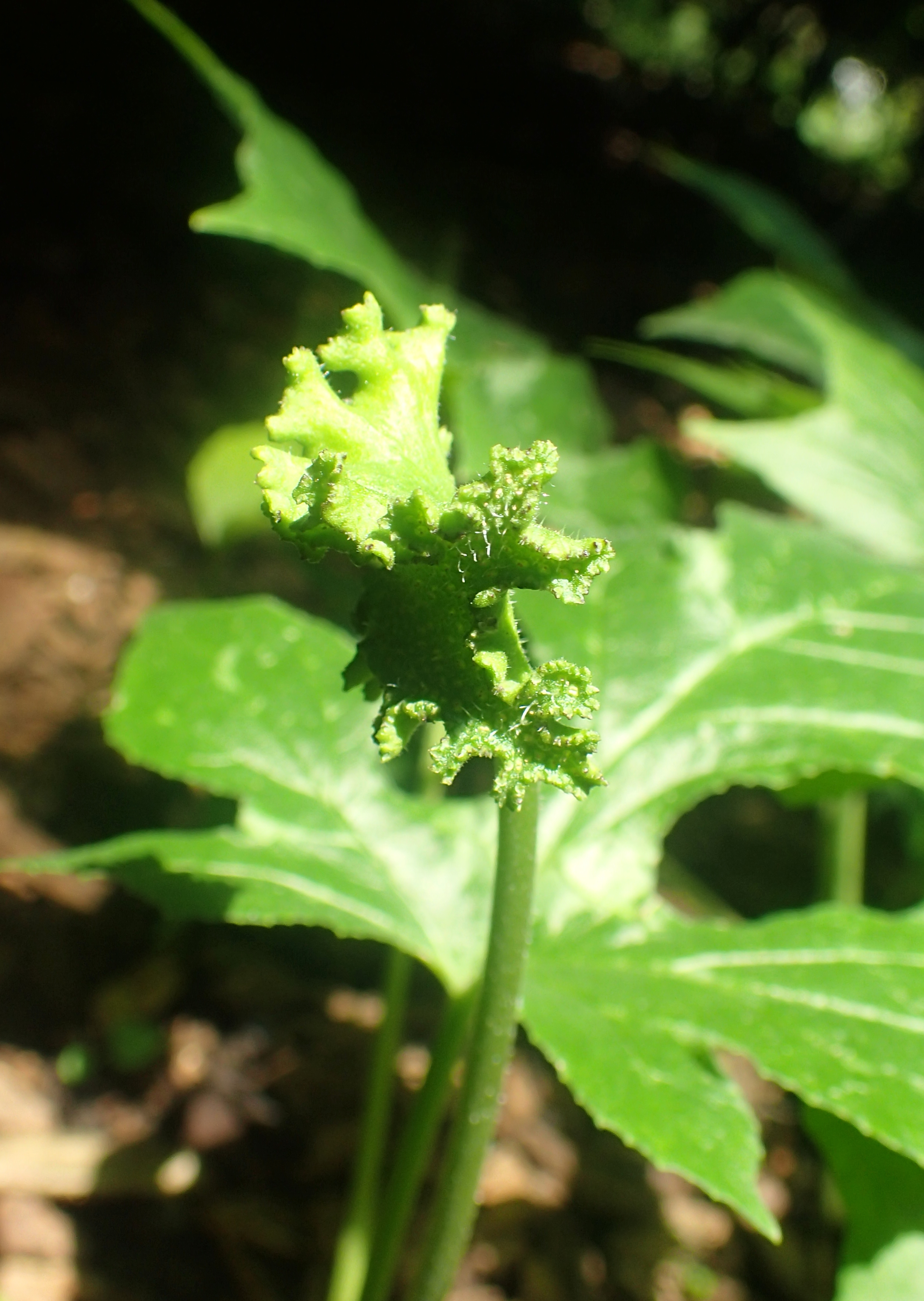

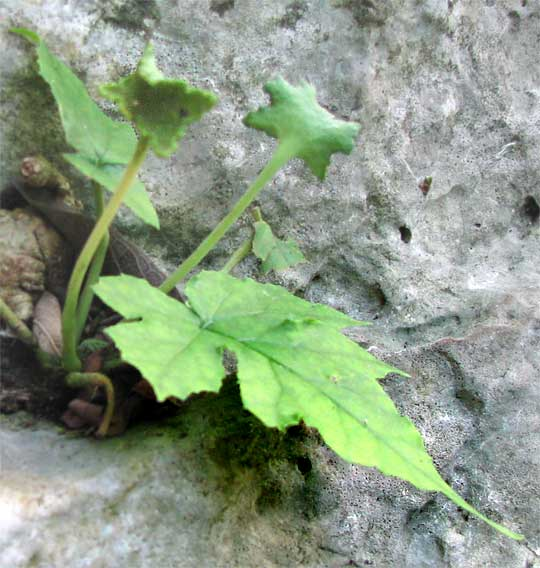

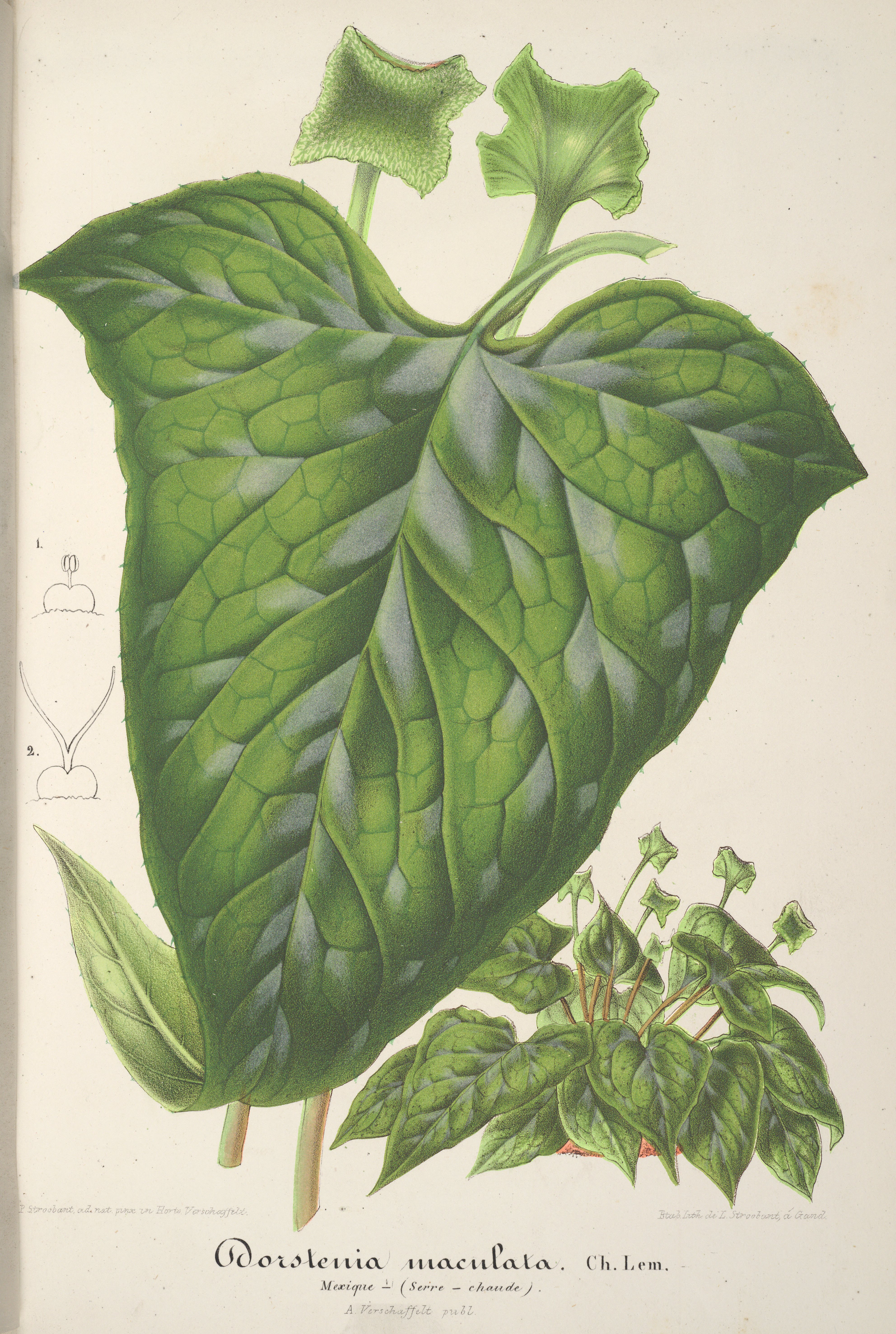

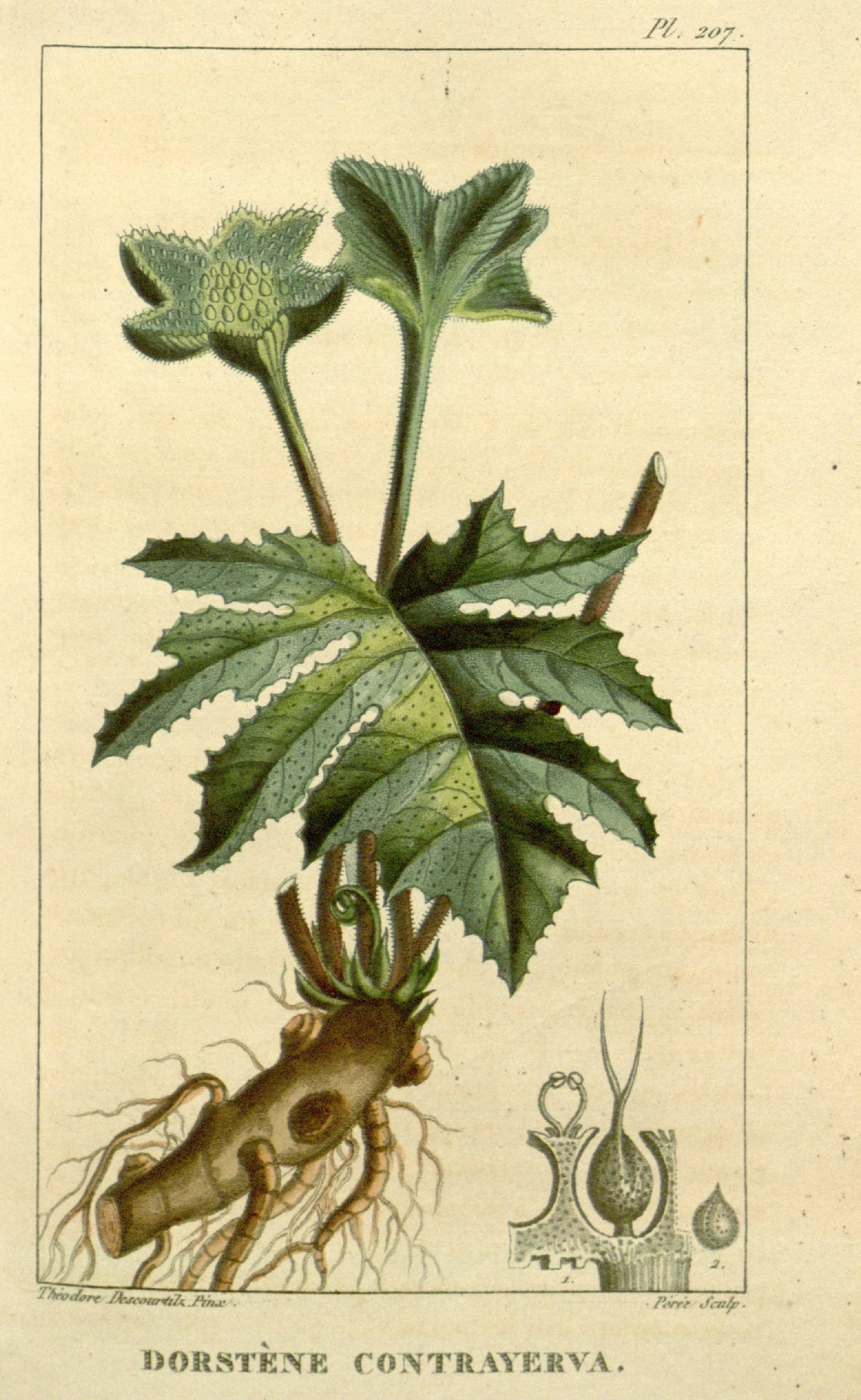

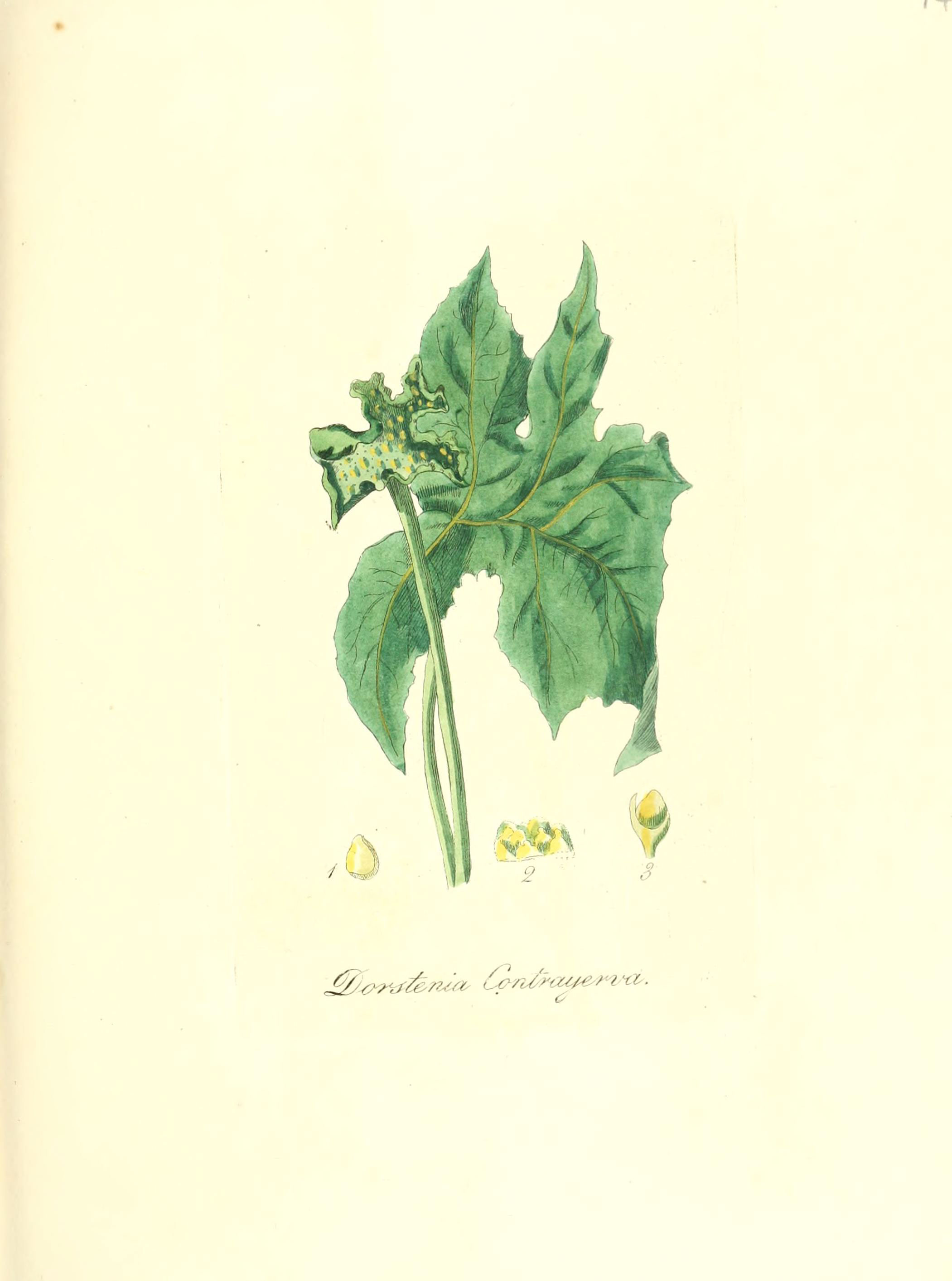

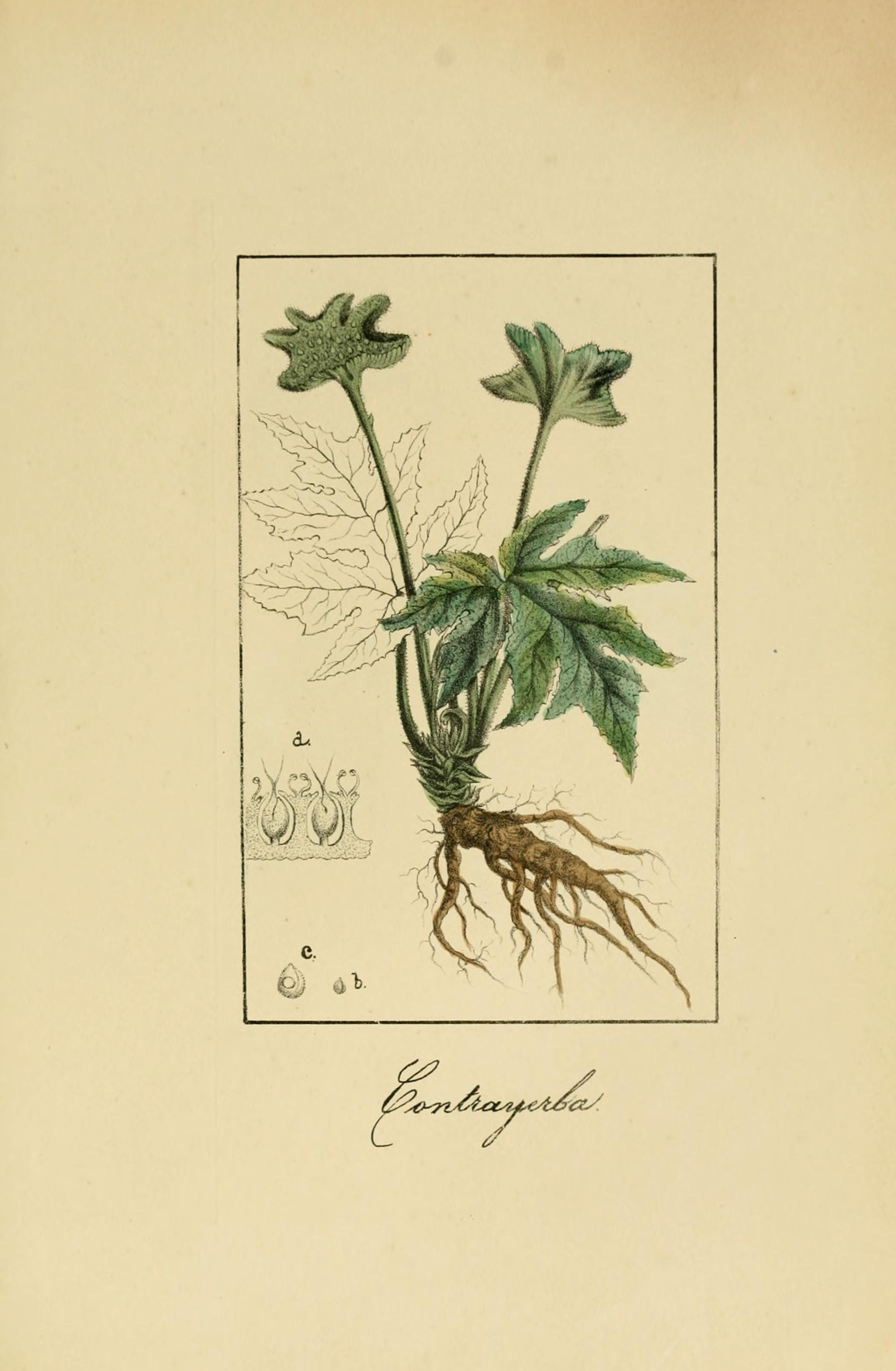

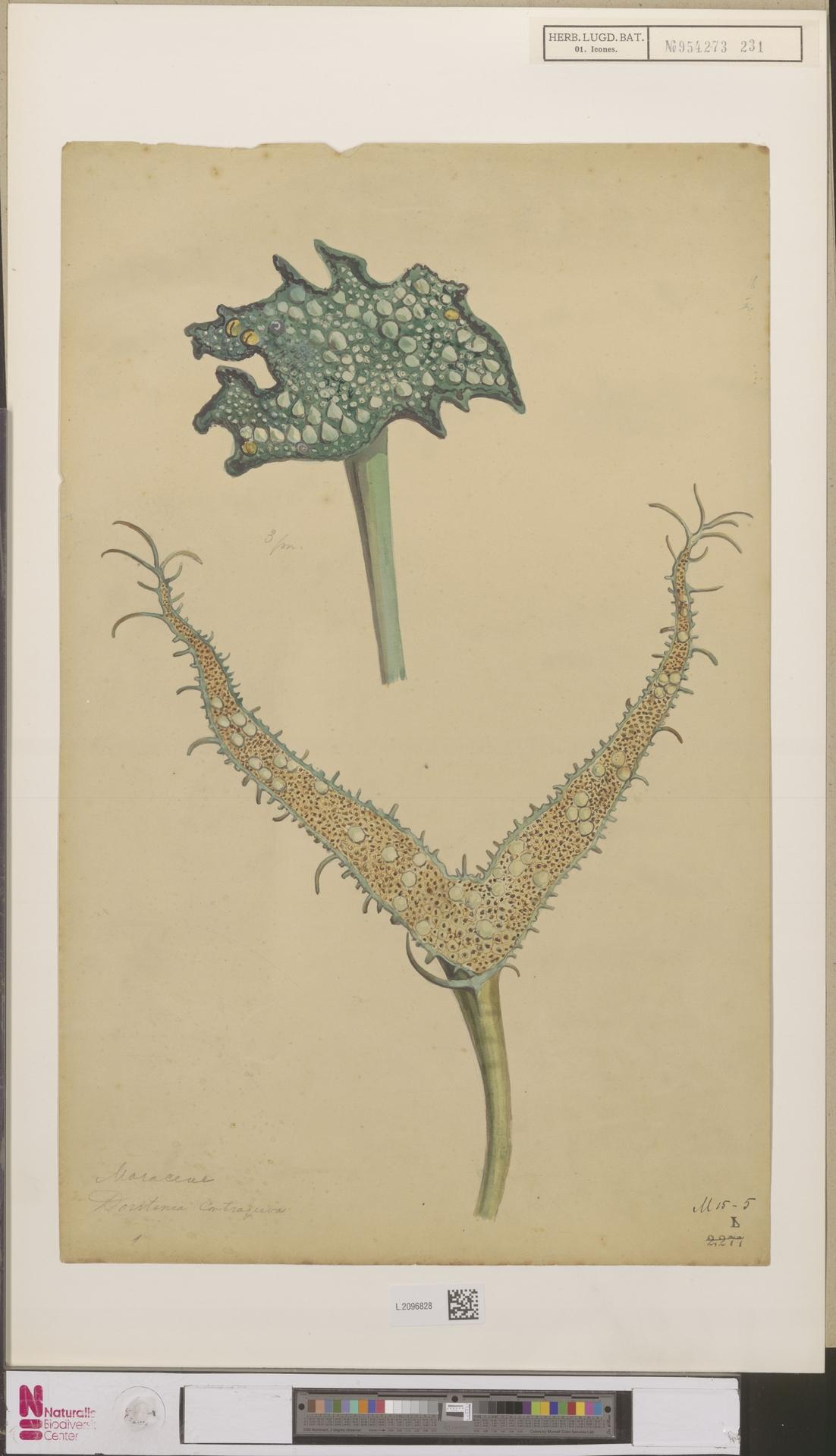
