= Edward Archer (physician) =

Edward Archer (1718–1789) was an English physician, closely associated with the practice of inoculation against smallpox.

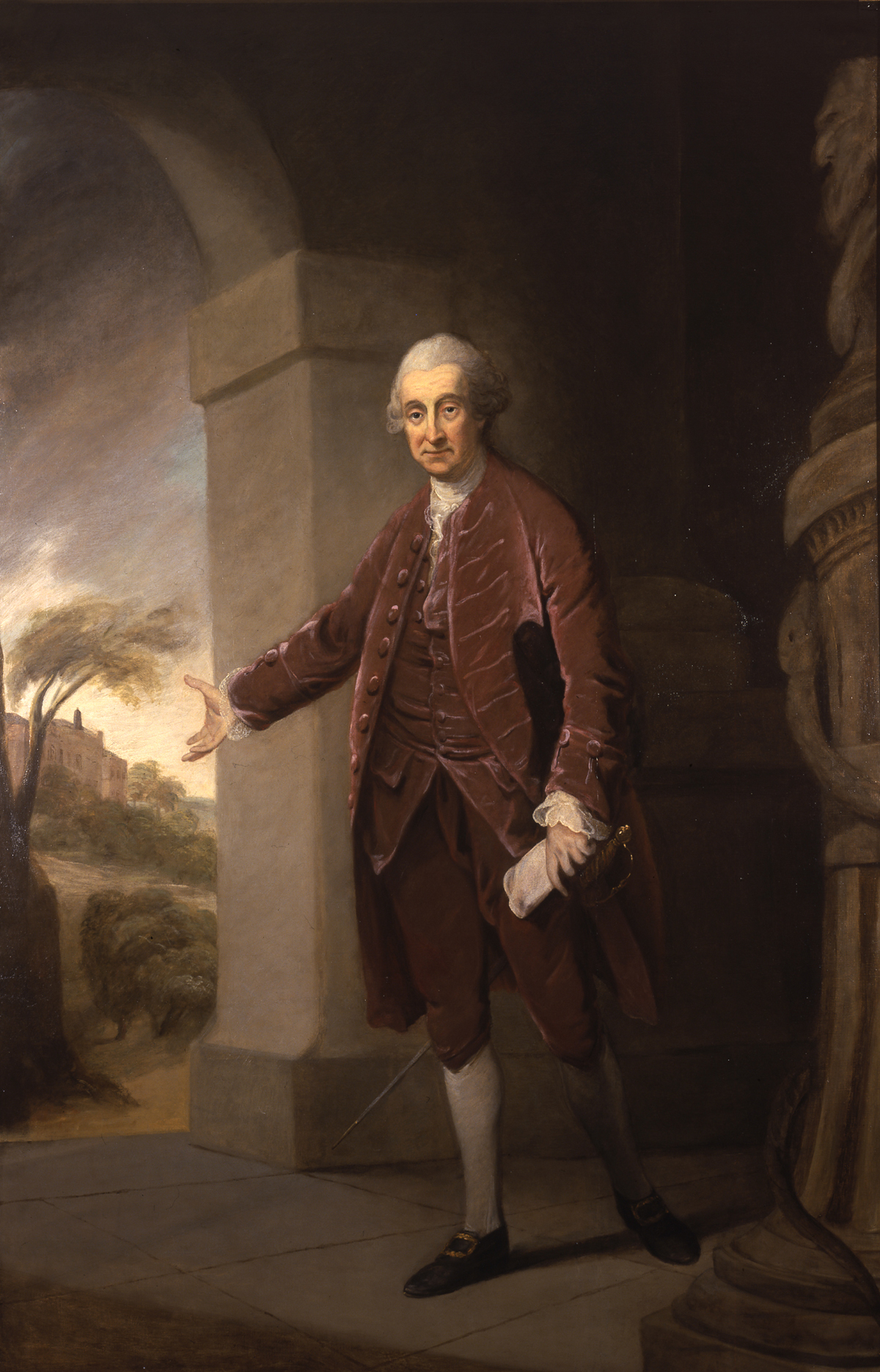
Edward Archer, 1782 portrait, showing what is thought to be the Small-Pox Hospital through the arch

== Life ==
Archer was born in Southwark, studying medicine in Edinburgh and afterwards in Leyden, where he graduated M.D. in 1746. In 1747 he was elected physician to the Smallpox Hospital in north London, which had recently been founded, amalgamating the "Hospital for the Small-pox" and the "Hospital for Inoculation", to give inoculations to those who previously could not afford the treatment. The hospital had had Robert Poole as its first physician, from 1746, but he left the country in 1748.

Archer had a private fortune, and took on little in the way of private practice. He gave most attention to the Smallpox Hospital. He ended his life 28 March 1789, dying within the walls of the hospital where he had worked for 42 years, as he wished. He was succeeded by William Lister, and then William Woodville from 1791, at the hospital, which was rebuilt starting in 1794.

== Works ==
Archer's M.D. dissertation was De Rheumatismo. He wrote a note on smallpox for the Journal Britannique for 1755, and an introductory epistle for An Account of Inoculation, presented to the Royal Commissioners of Health in Sweden, by David Schultz, M.D., who attended the Small-pox Hospital in London near a twelvemonth (1758), translated from the Swedish original by Schultz. David Schultz von Schultzenheim was a Prussian who promoted inoculation in Sweden.

== Notes ==
Attribution

This article incorporates text from a publication now in the public domain: Stephen, Leslie, ed. (1885). "Archer, Edward". Dictionary of National Biography. Vol. 2. London: Smith, Elder & Co.
