= William Woodville =

English physician and botanist (1752–1805)

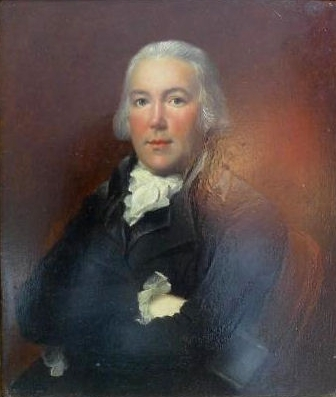
Portrait in oil Lemuel Francis Abbott

William Woodville (1752 – 26 March 1805) was an English physician and botanist. Convinced by the work of Edward Jenner, he was among the first to promote vaccination. His four volume book on medical botany published between 1790 and 1794 with 300 illustrations of medicinal plants by James Sowerby was an important reference work for physicians in the nineteenth century with a second edition in 1810 followed by a revision in 1832 by William Jackson Hooker and George Spratt.

== Biography ==
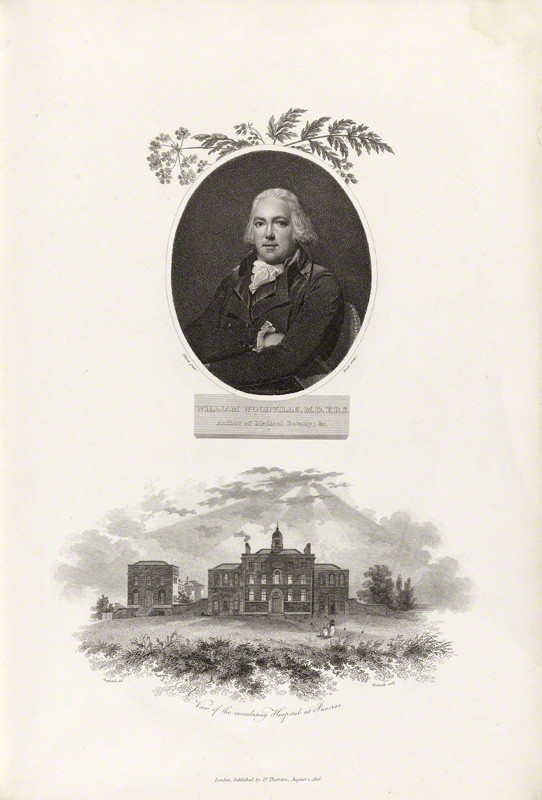
William Woodville with 'View of the inoculating Hospital at Pancras' (1806).

William Woodville was born at Cockermouth in Cumberland in 1752 in wealthy Quaker family. He apprenticed to the apothecary William Birtwhistle before going to study medicine at Edinburgh University, where he became the favourite pupil of William Cullen. He graduated M.D. on 12 September 1775. After spending some time on mainland Europe, he began to practise at Papcastle in his native county, but shortly afterwards moved to Denbigh. He was a member of the Society of Friends (Quakers). However, in 1778 he accidentally shot a man in his garden through his window and this led to him being disowned by them. In 1782, he came to London, became physician to the Middlesex dispensary, and was admitted a licentiate of the College of Physicians on 9 August 1784.

On 17 March 1791, he was elected physician to the smallpox and inoculation hospitals at St. Pancras, in succession to Edward Archer. He published the first volume of a projected two-part history of inoculation (variolation) in 1796. However, he became particularly interested in Edward Jenner's introduction of what was soon to be known as smallpox vaccine, which used material obtained from cases of cowpox. He was one of the first to try the new method, but his results differed substantially from Jenner's, and there was disagreement about the effects of the new procedure. It was suspected at the time that Woodville's vaccine had become contaminated with material from his smallpox patients, a conclusion supported by detailed analysis of the evidence.

He had a strong taste for botany, and was elected a fellow of the Linnean Society in 179. He appropriated two acres of ground at King's Cross belonging to the hospital as a botanical garden, which he maintained at his own expense. He wrote an important study of medical botany.

Woodville lived in Ely Place, Holborn. He died at the smallpox hospital on 26 March 1805, and was buried in the Friends' burial-ground, Bunhill Fields, on 4 April. His portrait, by Lemuel Abbott, was presented to the smallpox hospital. It was engraved by William Bond.

== Writings ==
- Medical Botany, 1790, vol 2, 1792, vol 3, 1793, Supp 1794. Second edition 1810, 3rd edition 1832.
- History of the Inoculation of the Smallpox in Great Britain, 1796.
- Reports of a Series of Inoculations for the Variolæ Vaccinæ or Cow-pox; with Remarks and Observations on this Disease considered as a Substitute for the Smallpox, 1799
- Observations on the Cow Pox, 1800
- A Comparative Statement of Facts and Observations relative to the Cow-pox, published by Doctors Jenner and Woodville, 1800.

He contributed to Rees's Cyclopædia a number of botanical articles, but the topics are not known.

== Sources ==
- "Woodville, William" . Dictionary of National Biography. London: Smith, Elder & Co. 1885–1900.
