= Theories of the Black Death =

Explanations and theories about the nature and transmission of the Black Death

Theories of the Black Death are a variety of explanations that have been advanced to explain the nature and transmission of the Black Death (1347–51). A number of epidemiologists from the 1980s to the 2000s challenged the traditional view that the Black Death was caused by plague based on the type and spread of the disease. The confirmation in 2010 and 2011 that Yersinia pestis DNA was associated with a large number of plague sites has led researchers to conclude that "Finally, plague is plague."

== Plague ==
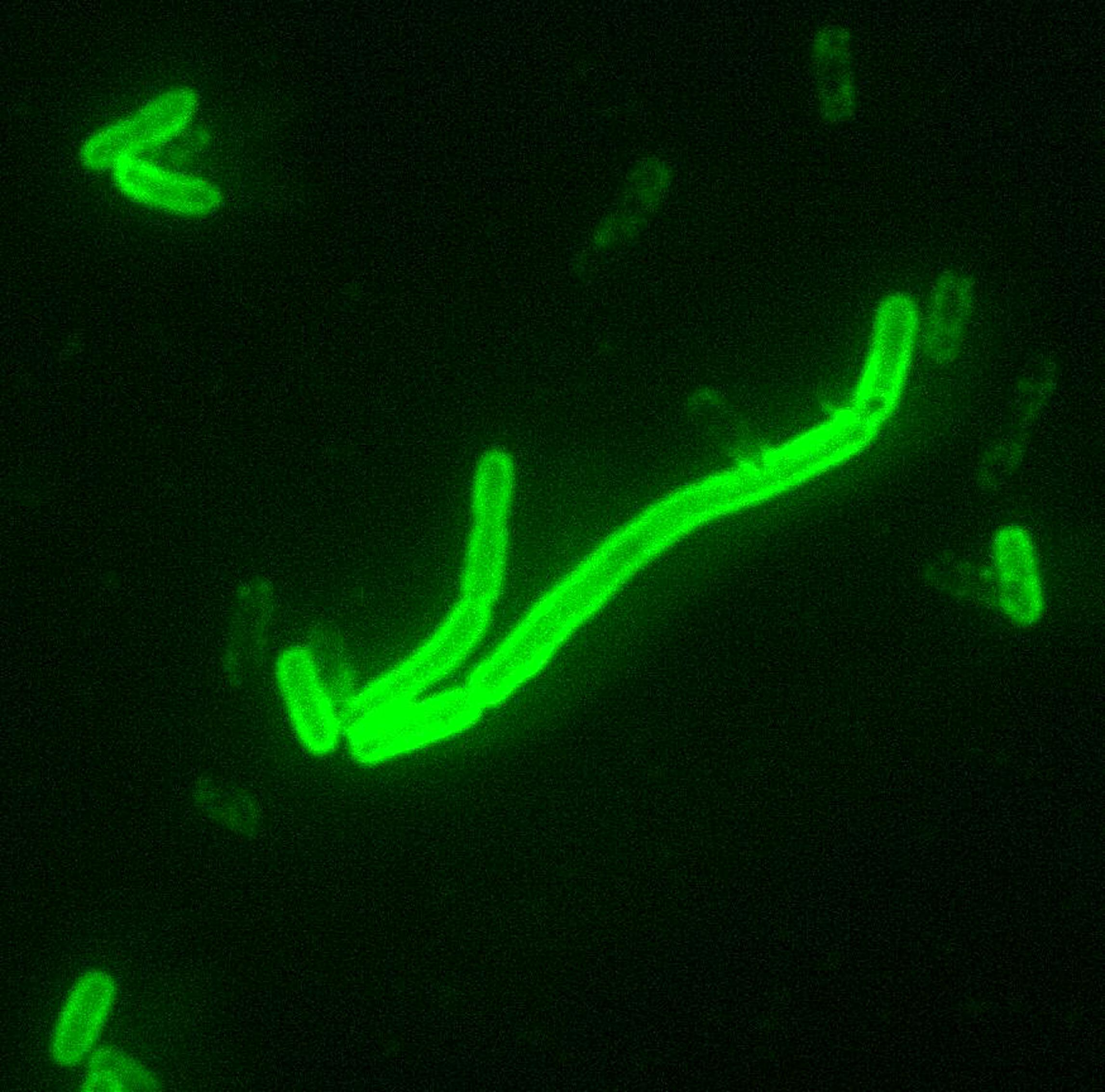
Yersinia pestis seen at 2000× magnification. This bacterium, carried and spread by the flea, is generally thought to have been the cause of millions of deaths.

Several possible causes have been advanced for the Black Death; the most prevalent is the bubonic plague theory. Efficient transmission of Yersinia pestis is generally thought to occur only through the bites of fleas whose mid guts become obstructed by replicating Y. pestis several days after feeding on an infected host. This blockage results in starvation and aggressive feeding behaviour by fleas that repeatedly attempt to clear their blockage by regurgitation, resulting in thousands of plague bacteria being flushed into the feeding site, infecting the host. However, modelling of epizootic plague observed in prairie dogs, suggests that occasional reservoirs of infection such as an infectious carcass, rather than "blocked fleas" are a better explanation for the observed epizootic behaviour of the disease in nature.

One hypothesis about the epidemiology—the appearance, spread, and especially disappearance—of plague from Europe is that the flea-bearing rodent reservoir of disease was eventually succeeded by another species. The black rat (Rattus rattus) was originally introduced from Asia to Europe by trade, but was subsequently displaced and succeeded throughout Europe by the bigger brown rat (Rattus norvegicus). The brown rat was not as prone to transmit the germ-bearing fleas to humans in large die-offs due to a different rat ecology. The dynamic complexities of rat ecology, herd immunity in that reservoir, interaction with human ecology, secondary transmission routes between humans with or without fleas, human herd immunity, and changes in each might explain the eruption, dissemination, and re-eruptions of plague that continued for centuries until its unexplained disappearance.

=== Signs and symptoms of the three forms of plague ===
The plague comes in three forms and it brought an array of signs and symptoms to those infected. The classic sign of bubonic plague was the appearance of buboes in the groin, the neck, and armpits, which oozed pus and bled. Most victims died within four to seven days after infection. The septicaemic plague is a form of "blood poisoning", and pneumonic plague is an airborne plague that attacks the lungs before the rest of the body.

The bubonic plague was the most commonly seen form during the Black Death. The bubonic form of the plague has a mortality rate of thirty to seventy-five percent and symptoms include fever of 38–41 °C (101–105 °F), headaches, painful aching joints, nausea and vomiting, and a general feeling of malaise. The second most common form is the pneumonic plague and has symptoms that include fever, cough, and blood-tinged sputum. As the disease progressed, sputum became free flowing and bright red and death occurred within 2 days. The pneumonic form of the plague has a high mortality rate at ninety to ninety-five percent. Septicemic plague is the least common of the three forms, with a mortality rate close to one hundred percent. Symptoms include high fevers and purple skin patches (purpura due to DIC). Both pneumonic and septicemic plague can be caused by flea bites when the lymph nodes are overwhelmed. In this case they are referred to as secondary forms of the disease.

David Herlihy identifies from the records another potential sign of the plague: freckle-like spots and rashes. Sources from Viterbo, Italy refer to "the signs which are vulgarly called lenticulae", a word which bears resemblance to the Italian word for freckles, lentiggini. These are not the swellings of buboes, but rather "darkish points or pustules which covered large areas of the body".

The uncharacteristically rapid spread of the plague could be due to respiratory droplet transmission, and low levels of immunity in the European population at that period. Historical examples of pandemics of other diseases in populations without previous exposure, such as smallpox and tuberculosis transmitted by aerosol amongst Native Americans, show that the first instance of an epidemic spreads faster and is far more virulent than later instances among the descendants of survivors, for whom natural selection has produced characteristics that are protective against the disease.

=== Vectors of Y. pestis ===
Historians who believe that the Black Death was indeed caused by bubonic plague have put forth several theories questioning the traditional identification of Rattus sp. and their associated fleas as plague's primary vector.

A 2012 report from the University of Bergen acknowledges that Y. pestis could have been the cause of the pandemic, but states that the epidemiology of the disease is different, most importantly the rapid spread and the lack of rats in Scandinavia and other parts of Northern Europe. R. rattus was present in Scandinavian cities and ports at the time of the Black Death but was not found in small, inland villages. Based on archaeological evidence from digs all over Norway, the black rat population was present in sea ports but remained static in the cold climate and would only have been sustained if ships continually brought black rats and that the rats would be unlikely to venture across open ground to remote villages. It argues that while healthy black rats are rarely seen, rats suffering from bubonic plague behave differently from healthy rats; where accounts from warmer climates mention rats falling from roofs and walls and piling high in the streets, Samuel Pepys, who described trifling observations and events of the London plague of 1665 in great detail, makes no mention of sick or dead rats, nor does Absalon Pederssøn in his diary, which contains detailed descriptions of a plague epidemic in Bergen in 1565. Ultimately, Hufthammer and Walløe offer the possibility of human fleas and lice in place of rats.

University of Oslo researchers concluded that Y. pestis was likely carried over the Silk Road via fleas on giant gerbils from Central Asia during intermittent warm spells.

Michael McCormick, a historian supporting bubonic plague as the Black Death, explains how archaeological research has confirmed that the black or "ship" rat (Rattus rattus) was already present in Roman and medieval Europe. Also, the DNA of Y. pestis has been identified in the teeth of the human victims, the same DNA which has been widely believed to have come from the infected rodents. Pneumonic expression of Y. pestis can be transmitted by human-to-human contact, but McCormick states that this does not spread as easily as previous historians have imagined. According to him, the rat is the only plausible agent of transmission that could have led to such a wide and quick spread of the plague. This is because of rats' proclivity to associate with humans and the ability of their blood to withstand very large concentrations of the bacillus. When rats died, their fleas (which were infected with bacterial blood) found new hosts in the form of humans and animals. The Black Death tapered off in the eighteenth century, and according to McCormick, a rat-based theory of transmission could explain why this occurred. The plague(s) had killed a large portion of the human host population of Europe and dwindling cities meant that more people were isolated, and so geography and demography did not allow rats to have as much contact with Europeans. Greatly curtailed communication and transportation systems due to the drastic decline in human population also hindered the replenishment of devastated rat colonies.

== Alternative explanations ==
Although Y. pestis as the causative agent of plague was still widely accepted during this period, scientific and historical investigations in the late 20th century through publication of conclusive evidence in 2011 led some researchers to doubt the long-held belief that the Black Death was an epidemic of bubonic plague.

=== Evidence against Y. pestis ===
The arguments for an alternate causative agent were based on differences in mortality levels, disease diffusion rates, rat distribution, flea reproduction and climate, and distribution of human population.

In 1984, Graham Twigg published The Black Death: A Biological Reappraisal, where he argued that the climate and ecology of Europe and particularly England made it nearly impossible for rats and fleas to have transmitted bubonic plague. Combining information on the biology of Rattus rattus, Rattus norvegicus, and the common fleas Xenopsylla cheopis and Pulex irritans with modern studies of plague epidemiology, particularly in India, where the R. rattus is a native species and conditions are nearly ideal for plague to be spread, Twigg concluded that it would have been nearly impossible for Yersinia pestis to have been the causative agent of the plague, let alone its explosive spread across Europe. Twigg also showed that the common alternate theory of entirely pneumonic spread does not hold up. He proposed, based on a reexamination of the evidence and symptoms, that the Black Death may actually have been an epidemic of pulmonary anthrax caused by Bacillus anthracis.

In 2002, Samuel K. Cohn published the controversial article, "The Black Death: End of the Paradigm". Cohn argued that the medieval and modern plagues were two distinct diseases differing in their symptoms, signs, and epidemiologies. Cohn's argument that medieval plague was not rat-based is supported by his claims that the modern and medieval plagues occurred in different seasons (a claim supported in a 2009 article by Mark Welford and Brian Bossak), had unparalleled cycles of recurrence, and varied in the manner in which immunity was acquired. The modern plague reaches its peak in seasons with high humidity and a temperature of between 50 °F (10 °C) and 78 °F (26 °C), as rats' fleas thrive in this climate. In comparison, the Black Death is recorded as occurring in periods during which rats' fleas could not have survived, i.e. hot Mediterranean summers above 78 °F (26 °C). In terms of recurrence, the Black Death on average did not resurface in an area for between five and fifteen years after it had occurred. In contrast, modern plagues often recur in a given area yearly for an average of eight to forty years. Last, Cohn presented evidence displaying that individuals gained immunity to the Black Death, unlike the modern plague, during the fourteenth century. He stated that in 1348, two-thirds of those suffering from plague died, in comparison to one-twentieth by 1382. Statistics display that immunity to the modern plague has not been acquired in modern times.

In the Encyclopedia of Population, Cohn pointed to five major weaknesses in the bubonic plague theory:

- very different transmission speeds – the Black Death was reported to have spread 385 km in 91 days (4.23 km/day) in 664, compared to 12–15 km a year for the modern bubonic plague, with the assistance of trains and cars
- difficulties with the attempt to explain the rapid spread of the Black Death by arguing that it was spread by the rare pneumonic form of the disease – in fact this form killed less than 0.3% of the infected population in its worst outbreak (Manchuria in 1911)
- different seasonality – the modern plague can only be sustained at temperatures between 10 and 26 °C and requires high humidity, while the Black Death occurred even in Norway in the middle of the winter and in the Mediterranean in the middle of hot dry summers
- very different death rates – in several places (including Florence in 1348) over 75% of the population appears to have died; in contrast the highest mortality for the modern bubonic plague was 3% in Bombay in 1903
- the cycles and trends of infection were very different between the diseases – humans did not develop resistance to the modern disease, but resistance to the Black Death rose sharply, so that eventually it became mainly a childhood disease

Cohn also pointed out that while the identification of the disease as having buboes relies on accounts of Boccaccio and others, they described buboes, abscesses, rashes and carbuncles occurring all over the body, the neck or behind the ears. In contrast, the modern disease rarely has more than one bubo, most commonly in the groin, and is not characterised by abscesses, rashes and carbuncles. This difference, he argued, ties in with the fact that fleas caused the modern plague and not the Black Death. Since flea bites do not usually reach beyond a person's ankles, in the modern period the groin was the nearest lymph node that could be infected. As the neck and the armpit were often infected during the medieval plague, it appears less likely that these infections were caused by fleas on rats.

=== Ebola-like virus ===
In 2001, Susan Scott and Christopher Duncan, respectively a demographer and zoologist from Liverpool University, proposed the theory that the Black Death might have been caused by an Ebola-like virus, not a bacterium. Their rationale was that this plague spread much faster and the incubation period was much longer than other confirmed Y. pestis–caused plagues. A longer period of incubation will allow carriers of the infection to travel farther and infect more people than a shorter one. When the primary vector is humans, as opposed to birds, this is of great importance. Epidemiological studies suggest the disease was transferred between humans (which happens rarely with Yersinia pestis and very rarely for Bacillus anthracis), and some genes that determine immunity to Ebola-like viruses are much more widespread in Europe than in other parts of the world. Their research and findings are thoroughly documented in Biology of Plagues. More recently the researchers have published computer modeling demonstrating how the Black Death has made around 10% of Europeans resistant to HIV.

=== Anthrax ===
In a similar vein, historian Norman Cantor, in In the Wake of the Plague: The Black Death and the World It Made (2001), suggested the Black Death might have been a combination of pandemics including a form of anthrax, a cattle murrain. He cited reported disease symptoms not in keeping with the known effects of either bubonic or pneumonic plague, the discovery of anthrax spores in a plague pit in Scotland, and the fact that meat from infected cattle was known to have been sold in many rural English areas prior to the onset of the plague. The means of infection varied widely, with infection in the absence of living or recently dead humans in Sicily (which speaks against most viruses). Also, diseases with similar symptoms were generally not distinguished between in that period (see murrain above), at least not in the Christian world; Chinese and Muslim medical records can be expected to yield better information which however only pertains to the specific disease(s) which affected these areas.

Cutaneous anthrax infection in humans shows up as a boil-like skin lesion that eventually forms an ulcer with a black center (eschar), often beginning as an irritating and itchy skin lesion or blister that is dark and usually concentrated as a black dot. Cutaneous infections generally form within the site of spore penetration between two and five days after exposure. Without treatment about 20% of cutaneous skin infection cases progress to toxemia and death. Respiratory infection in humans initially presents with cold or flu-like symptoms for several days, followed by severe (and often fatal) respiratory collapse. Historical mortality was 92%. Gastrointestinal infection in humans is most often caused by eating anthrax-infected meat and is characterized by serious gastrointestinal difficulty, vomiting of blood, severe diarrhea, acute inflammation of the intestinal tract, and loss of appetite. After the bacteria invades the bowel system, it spreads through the bloodstream throughout the body, making more toxins on the way.

== Molecular evidence for Y. pestis ==
Recently, however, more evidence has appeared that the Black Death was caused by Y. pestis.

In 2000, Didier Raoult and others reported finding Y. pestis DNA by performing a "suicide PCR" on tooth pulp tissue from a fourteenth-century plague cemetery in Montpellier. Drancourt and Raoult reported similar findings in a 2007 study.

However, other researchers argued the study was flawed and cited contrary evidence. In 2003, Susan Scott of the University of Liverpool argued that there was no conclusive reason to believe the Montpellier teeth were from Black Death victims. Also in 2003, a team led by Alan Cooper from Oxford University tested 121 teeth from sixty-six skeletons found in 14th century mass graves, including well-documented Black Death plague pits in East Smithfield and Spitalfields. Their results showed no genetic evidence for Y. pestis, and Cooper concluded that though in 2003 "[w]e cannot rule out Yersinia as the cause of the Black Death ... right now there is no molecular evidence for it." Other researchers argued that those burial sites where Y. pestis could not be found had nothing to do with the Black Death in the first place.

In October 2010 the journal PLoS Pathogens published a paper by Haensch et al. (2010), a multinational team that investigated the role of Yersinia pestis in the Black Death. The paper detailed the results of new surveys that combined ancient DNA analyses and protein-specific detection which were used to find DNA and protein signatures specific for Y. pestis in human skeletons from widely distributed mass graves in northern, central and southern Europe that were associated archaeologically with the Black Death and subsequent resurgences. The authors concluded that this research, together with prior analyses from the south of France and Germany

"...ends the debate about the etiology of the Black Death, and unambiguously demonstrates that Y. pestis was the causative agent of the epidemic plague that devastated Europe during the Middle Ages."

Significantly, the study also identified two previously unknown but related clades (genetic branches) of the Y. pestis genome that were associated with distinct medieval mass graves. These were found to be ancestral to modern isolates of the modern Y. pestis strains Orientalis and Medievalis, suggesting that these variant strains (which are now presumed to be extinct) may have entered Europe in two distinct waves.

The presence of Y. pestis during the Black Death and its phylogenetic placement was definitely established in 2011 with the publication of a Y. pestis genome using new amplification techniques used on DNA extracts from teeth from over 100 samples from the East Smithfield burial site in London.

Surveys of plague pit remains in France and England indicate that the first variant entered western Europe through the port of Marseille around November 1347 and spread through France over the next two years, eventually reaching England in the spring of 1349, where it spread through the country in three successive epidemics. However, surveys of plague pit remains from the Netherlands town of Bergen op Zoom showed that the Y. pestis genotype responsible for the pandemic that spread through the Low Countries from 1350 differed from that found in Britain and France, implying that Bergen op Zoom (and possibly other parts of the southern Netherlands) was not directly infected from England or France in AD 1349, suggesting that a second wave of plague infection, distinct from those in Britain and France, may have been carried to the Low Countries from Norway, the Hanseatic cities, or another site.
