= Pestis =

Pestis may refer to:

- Plague (disease)
  - Yersinia pestis, a Gram-negative rod-shaped bacterium species
- Pestilence (disambiguation)
- Scrutinium Pestis, a 1658 book by Athanasius Kircher

== Places ==
- Pestiš, a village in the municipality of Prokuplje, Serbia
- Peștiș, a village in Aleșd town, Bihor County, Romania
- Peștiș (Cerna), a tributary of the Cerna in Hunedoara County, Romania
- Peștiș (Mureș), a tributary of the Mureș in Arad and Timiș Counties, Romania

== See also ==
- Nosology, a branch of medicine that deals with classification of diseases
