= Plasminogen activator Pla =

Identifiers
- EC no.: 3.4.23.48
- CAS no.: 101028-08-4

Databases
- IntEnz: IntEnz view
- BRENDA: BRENDA entry
- ExPASy: NiceZyme view
- KEGG: KEGG entry
- MetaCyc: metabolic pathway
- PRIAM: profile
- PDB structures: RCSB PDB PDBe PDBsum
Search
- PMC: articles
- PubMed: articles
- NCBI: proteins

Plasminogen activator Pla (EC 3.4.23.48) is an enzyme. This enzyme catalyses the following chemical reaction

Converts human Glu-plasminogen to plasmin by cleaving the Arg^{560}-Val peptide bond that is also hydrolysed by the mammalian u-plasminogen activator and t-plasminogen activator. Also cleaves arginyl bonds in other proteins.

This enzyme is isolated from the bacterium Yersinia pestis that causes plague. Y. pestis carries a 9.5-kb plasmid, pPCP1, that encodes the plasminogen activator. Pla is a critical virulence factor for plague. In bubonic plague, Pla promotes the invasion of Y. pestis from subcutaneous sites of inoculation into the lymphatic system and deeper tissues. In contrast, Pla is important for bacterial growth in the lung during pneumonic plague but it is not required for dissemination to other tissues. It is found in the outer membrane of gram-negative bacteria, and it functions as a surface protease and an adhesin. It has suggested that the fate of Y.pestis infection of the lung is decided extremely early during infection, and that Pla plays a dual role to tilt the balance in favor of the pathogen. In the initial stages of infection, Pla inhibits the activation of complement system and neutrophil-mediated killing such as phagocytosis and degranulation with its proteolytic activity. In addition, with its adhesin function, it suppresses the neutrophil influx, and facilitates type three secretion system (T3SS) to deliver multiple toxic Yersinia effector proteins Yops directly into target cells to inhibit the cytokine signalling.
