= Neolithic decline =

Prehistoric collapse in human populations

The Neolithic decline was a rapid collapse in populations between about 3450 and 3000 BCE during the Neolithic period in western Eurasia. The specific causes of that broad population decline are still debated. While heavily populated settlements were regularly created, abandoned, and resettled during the Neolithic, after around 5400 years ago, a great number of those settlements were permanently abandoned. The population decline is associated with worsening agricultural conditions and a decrease in cereal production. Other suggested causes include the emergence of communicable diseases spread from animals living in close quarters with humans.

The population increase between 5950 and 5550 BP (4000 to 3600 BC) that preceded the decline was catalysed by the introduction of agriculture, along with the spread of technologies such as pottery, the wheel, and animal husbandry. After the Neolithic decline, there were massive human migrations from the Pontic–Caspian steppe into eastern and central Europe, beginning approximately 4800 BP (2850 BC).

== Plague ==
An ancient version of the Yersinia pestis has come up from multiple skeletal studies throughout Eurasia, skeletons which have dated back to around the estimated periods of the Neolithic Decline. Additionally, genomes of the plague have been found as far back as 5,000 BP in areas such as Latvia and Sweden.

=== Discoveries in Europe ===
One 5,000-year old individual buried in Riņņukalns, Latvia, was infected with an early Yersinia pestis strain, shortly after it split from its antecessor Y. pseudotuberculosis c. 7,000 years ago.

A tomb in modern-day Frälsegården in Gökhem parish, Falbygden, Sweden, contained 79 corpses buried within a short time of one another about 4,900 years ago. This discovery uncovered fragments of a unique strain of the plague pathogen Yersinia pestis found in two individual's teeth. The strain contained the "plasminogen activator gene that is sufficient to cause pneumonic plague", an extremely deadly form of the plague which is airborne and directly communicable between humans. This strain of plague, researchers claim, alongside high demands of resources whilst living in close proximity to each other, would have allowed a pneumonic plague to quickly spread amongst inhabitants and wipe them out. A 2025 archeological study exposed domesticated sheep from the Eurasian Steppe as a potential host organism for the plague pathogen.

In the gallery graves of the Neolithic Wartberg Culture, dozens or up to hundreds of individuals are preserved. A recent study by researchers from Kiel University (Collaborative Research Centre 1266) have found that only two of 133 examined individuals were infected. As most were not, they conclude that no massive plague outbreak occurred. Moreover, they found the bacterium in bones of a dog. It is possible that dogs played a role in infections, but more research is required on this topic.

Neolithic-era human teeth from Eurasia have also shown evidence of some of the oldest strains of Yersinia pestis. The ages of the skeletons identified between 2,800 and 5,000 years old, with seven of the one hundred and one individuals carrying similar sequences of the bacterium. Additionally, studies of the ancient strains discovered show these ancient strains lack the Yersinia murine toxin (ymt), which would have prevented the strains from using fleas as a vector.

=== Discoveries in Asia ===
A similar site was found in China in 2011; the site Hamin Mangha in northeast China dates back to approximately 5000 years ago and features a small structure filled with almost 100 burnt bodies. Whilst there are several theories as what the reasons are for so many bodies in one location, such as a geological disaster or a ritual sacrifice, a plague is also considered as a hypothesis. In the case of the plague, evidence comes in the form of the placement of the bodies suggesting others carrying them in (meaning they were already dead before the fire), alongside being intact before being burned, and the lack of artifacts alongside the bodies. Two other sites like these have been found in Northeast China: Miaozigou and Laijia, but archaeologists did not speculate as to the causal agent.

=== Counterarguments ===
Some studies, such as those from the researchers from the Kiel University, have contested the hypothesis that the plague was responsible for the Neolithic decline. Analysis of the plague bacteria that infected a hunter-gatherer in Latvia during this period indicates that, unlike modern plague strains, the strain which afflicted this man was incapable of causing flea-spread bubonic plague and could only cause septicemic plague via a rodent bite or a largely non-contagious case of pneumonic plague, implying that the disease would have had difficulty spreading across vast distances in a short amount of time. The man identified in this particular case, after being studied, does not have a clear indicator of how much he was actually affected by the bacteria. Importantly, and supported by the results from the gallery graves of the Wartberg Culture, they do not see indications for a mass-outbreak.

== Epidemiology ==
=== Gene studies of ancient Yersinia pestis ===
Studies of the ancient variations of the bacteria have tried to show connections to the specific strain they studied and the more modern strands, such as ones during the Black Death. Studies in Sweden, on the Gok2 Neolithic Yersinia pestis strain, discovered it to be the basal to all known Y. pestis strains with the use of genome reconstruction, as well as containing plasminogen activators genes that would have allowed it to start a pneumonic plague. Other cases revealed a lack of ability to be able to use fleas as a vector of transmission; the case in Sweden contained Yersinia murine toxin which prevented the use of fleas, alongside a separate case studying late bronze-age bodies revealing the use of fleas in transmission would have occurred around the time after the collapse, being a few hundred years off.

== Sources ==
- Colledge, Sue; Connolly, James; Crema, Enrico; Shennan, Stephen (23 August 2019). "Neolithic population crash in northwest Europe associated with agricultural crisis". Quaternary Research. 92 (3): 686. Bibcode:2019QuRes..92..686C. doi:10.1017/qua.2019.42. S2CID 202186375.
- Rasmussen, Simon; Allentoft, Morten Erik; Nielsen, Kasper; Orlando, Ludovic; Sikora, Martin; Sjögren, Karl-Göran; Pedersen, Anders Gorm; Schubert, Mikkel; Van Dam, Alex; Kapel, Christian Moliin Outzen; Nielsen, Henrik Bjørn; Brunak, Søren; Avetisyan, Pavel; Epimakhov, Andrey; Khalyapin, Mikhail Viktorovich (2015-10-22). "Early divergent strains of Yersinia pestis in Eurasia 5,000 years ago". Cell. 163 (3): 571–582.
- Rascovan, Nicolas; Sjögren, Karl-Göran; Kristiansen, Kristian; Nielsen, Rasmus; Willerslev, Eske; Desnues, Cristelle; Rasmussen, Simon (10 January 2019). "Emergence and Spread of Basal Lineages of Yersinia pestis during the Neolithic Decline". Cell. 176 (2): 295–305. doi:10.1016/j.cell.2018.11.005. PMID 30528431. S2CID 54447284.
- Seersholm, F.V., Ramsøe, A., Cao, J. et al., "Population discontinuity in the Paris Basin linked to evidence of the Neolithic decline", Nat Ecol Evol, 2026 https://doi.org/10.1038/s41559-026-03027-z
- Susat, Julian; Lübke, Harald; Immel, Alexander; Brinker, Ute; Macāne, Aija; Meadows, John; Steer, Britta; Tholey, Andreas; Zagorska, Ilga; Gerhards, Guntis; Schmölcke, Ulrich; Kalniņš, Mārcis; Franke, Andre; Pētersone-Gordina, Elīna; Teßman, Barbara (2021-06-29). "A 5,000-year-old hunter-gatherer already plagued by Yersinia pestis". Cell Reports. 35 (13). doi:10.1016/j.celrep.2021.109278. ISSN 2211–1247. PMID 34192537.
