= Pest =

Pest or The Pest may refer to:

== Science and medicine ==
- Pest (organism), an animal or plant deemed to be detrimental to humans or human concerns
  - Weed, a plant considered undesirable
- Infectious disease, an illness resulting from an infection
  - Plague (disease), an infectious disease caused by the bacterium Yersinia pestis
    - Black Death (the Plague), the deadliest pandemic recorded in human history

== Film ==
- The Pest (1914 film), an American short film starring Charlie Chaplin
- The Pest (1917 film), an American film starring Oliver Hardy
- The Pest (1919 film), an American film starring Mabel Normand
- The Pest (1922 film), an American film starring Stan Laurel
- The Pest (1997 film), an American film starring John Leguizamo

== Music ==
- Pest (band), a British music group
- Pest (musician) (born 1975), Norwegian black metal vocalist

== Places ==
- Pest, Hungary, the geographic region of Budapest
  - Royal University of Pest
- Pest County, an administrative division of Hungary, surrounding Budapest

== Other uses ==
- PESTS, an anonymous activist arts group
- Pest (ice hockey), an ice hockey player specialising in aggravating opponents

== See also ==
- PEST (disambiguation)
- Pestilence (disambiguation)
- Annoyance, a mental state characterized by irritation and distraction
