= PEST =

PEST may refer to:

- PEST analysis, framework used in strategic management
- PEST sequence, is a peptide sequence in proteins
- Specialized Unit for Special Tactics (Slovene: Posebna Enota za Specialno Taktiko), special forces unit of the Slovenian Military Police

== See also ==
- Pest (disambiguation)
