= Bubo =

Inflammation of the lymph nodes

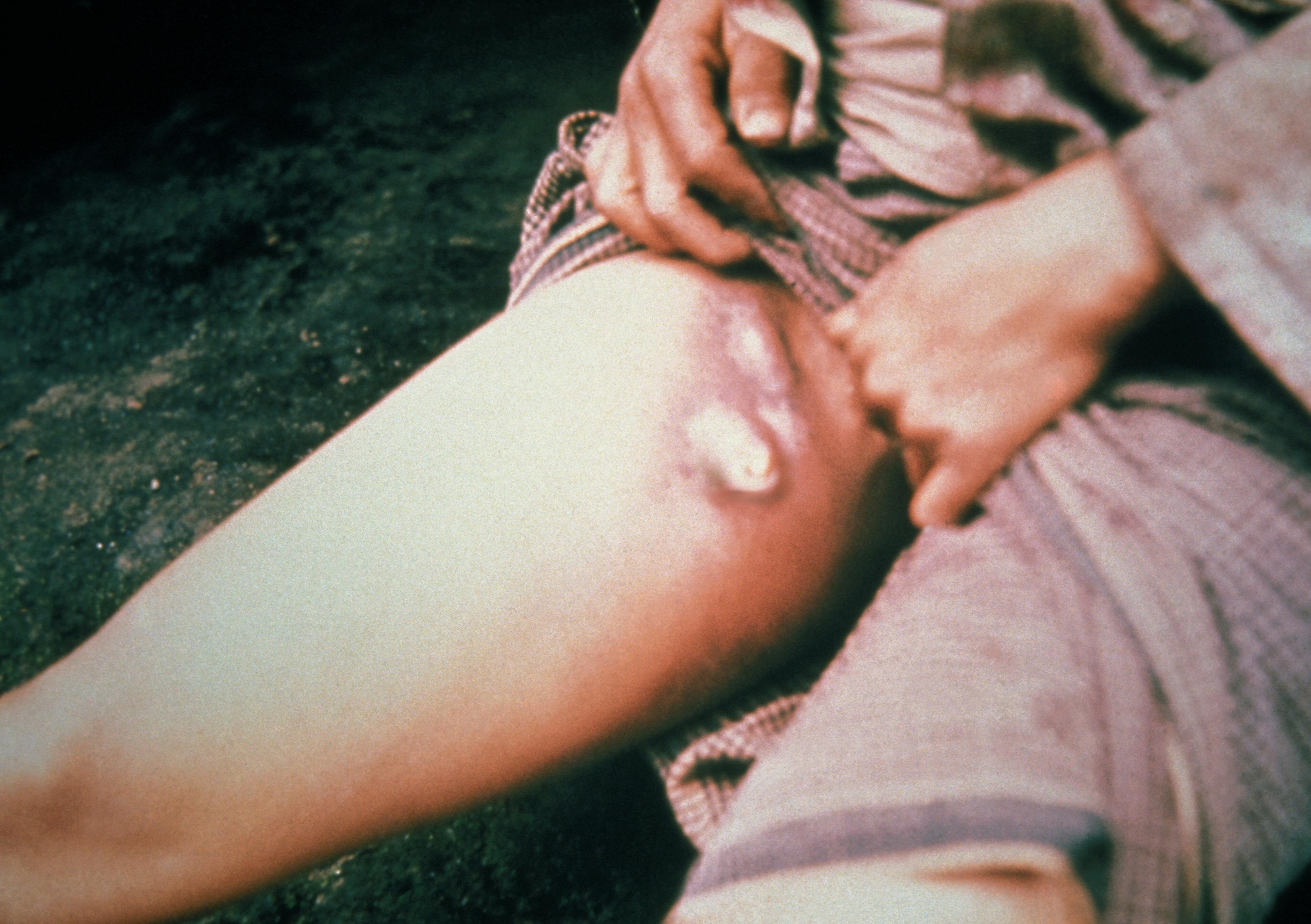
Buboes on the leg, caused by bubonic plague

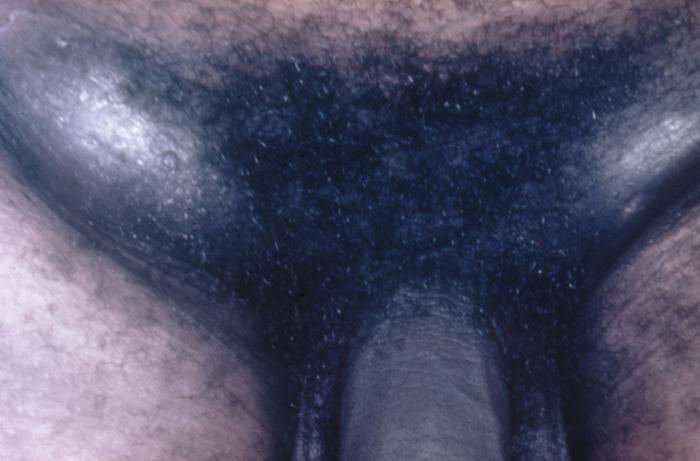
Buboes in the groin area of a male with a Chancroid infection

A bubo (Greek βουβών, boubṓn, 'groin') is adenitis or inflammation of the lymph nodes and is an example of reactive infectious lymphadenopathy.

== Classification ==
Buboes are a symptom of bubonic plague and occur as painful swellings in the thighs, neck, groin or armpits. They are caused by Yersinia pestis bacteria spreading from flea bites through the bloodstream to the lymph nodes, where the bacteria replicate, causing the nodes to swell. Plague buboes may turn black and necrotic, rotting away the surrounding tissue, or they may rupture, discharging large amounts of pus. Infection can spread from buboes around the body, resulting in other forms of the disease such as pneumonic plague.

== Management ==
Plague patients whose buboes swell to such a size that they burst, tend to survive the disease. Before the discovery of antibiotics, doctors often drained buboes with leeches or heated rods to save patients.

Buboes are also symptoms of other diseases, such as chancroid and lymphogranuloma venereum. In these conditions, a two-week course of antibiotics is the recommended treatment, and incision and drainage or excision of the swollen lymph nodes is best avoided. However, aspiration may sometimes be performed to prevent buboes from rupturing. Although incision and drainage yields better results in such cases—since usually no further intervention is necessary, whereas repeat aspirations may be required—incision and drainage wounds may heal more slowly, increasing the risk of secondary infection.
