= Septicemic plague =

Human disease caused by Yersinia pestis

- Other names: Septicaemic plague
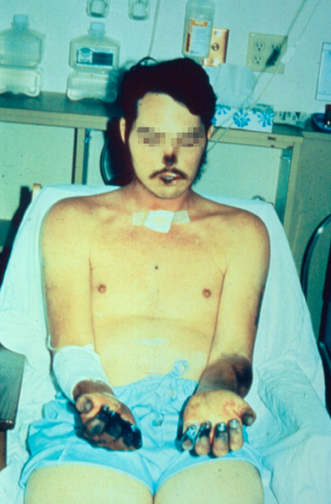
- Necrosis of the nose, lips, and fingers in a patient recovering from septicemic plague
- Specialty: Infectious diseases
- Symptoms: Initially nonspecific, including fever, chills, headache, malaise; eventually internal and external bleeding
- Complications: Gangrene, meningitis, shock, pneumonic plague leading to ARDS
- Usual onset: 1–7 days after exposure
- Causes: Yersinia pestis spread by fleas or handling infected animals
- Diagnostic method: Typically by finding the bacterium in fluid form from blood or sputum
- Differential diagnosis: Other systemic bacterial infections
- Prevention: Plague vaccine, avoiding dead animals
- Treatment: With antibiotics and vaccination
- Prognosis: Fatal if untreated
- Frequency: 10% of all plague cases (as of 2015)

Septicemic plague is one of three types of plague caused by Yersinia pestis, a gram-negative species of bacterium. Septicemic plague is a systemic disease in which Y. pestis rapidly infects the bloodstream, initially causing nonspecific symptoms including fever, chills, malaise, abdominal pain, diarrhea, and vomiting. As the disease progresses, disseminated intravascular coagulation causes internal and external bleeding, gangrene, and shock. Left untreated, septicemic plague is almost always fatal, sometimes within hours of initial symptoms. It is one of three forms of plague, along with bubonic (affecting the lymph nodes) and pneumonic (affecting the lungs) plagues.

Septicemic plague is mainly spread by infected fleas that live on small mammals, but can also result from handling infected mammals. It can develop either directly from exposure to Y. pestis or as a complication of untreated bubonic plague. In the case of primary infection, Y. pestis bacteria enter the skin after a flea bite and travel throughout the bloodstream, showing no localizing signs of infection. This makes diagnosis difficult, as plague is generally rare and initial symptoms resemble several other, more common bloodstream infections. Diagnosis is made by finding bacteria in the bloodstream.

== Signs and symptoms ==
Initial symptoms of septicemic plague are nonspecific, including sudden fever, chills, and malaise (general discomfort). Gastrointestinal symptoms, including abdominal pain, diarrhea, and vomiting can also be present, further complicating initial diagnosis. Septicemic plague can develop from untreated bubonic plague, in which Y. pestis infects and reproduces within lymph nodes; in these cases, characteristic buboes are also present. However, primary bloodstream infection does not present with any buboes. These nonspecific symptoms make correct diagnosis difficult.

As bacteria continue to multiply throughout the bloodstream, infection causes disseminated intravascular coagulation in which small blood clots form throughout the body, using up clotting factors and platelets. This may cause bleeding under the skin. Eventually, tissues begin to turn black and die, causing gangrene of the fingers, toes, nose, and ears. Fluid loss eventually causes shock and organ failure. If infection reaches the lungs, the condition can advance to pneumonic plague, causing acute respiratory distress syndrome (ARDS), a deadly type of respiratory failure.

== Cause ==
=== Transmission ===
Human Yersinia infections most commonly result from the bite of an infected flea or occasionally an infected mammal.

Rats specifically were a mammal that played a huge part in the spread of the disease. When rats that carried the plague died of the disease, then the fleas that were using those rodents as a food source must quickly seek a different blood stream, making things very problematic for any human nearby.

After a flea consumes the blood of an infected rat, they are unable to get blood to their stomachs as masses form due to the Yersinia bacteria that is now in the flea. These masses don't allow for blood to be processed properly, leaving the flea feeling constant hunger, and this results in more bites on humans. The exposure to a flea bite from an infected flea may cause bubonic plague in humans that could develop into the septicemic plague.

Cats and dogs were also susceptible to bites from infected fleas. These cats and dogs could then expose humans to the plague when the animal brings those infected fleas around people.

However, like most bacterial systemic diseases, the disease may also be transmitted through an opening in the skin. It can also be transmitted by inhaling infectious droplets of moisture from sneezes or coughs, if the bacteria spread to the lungs and pneumonic plague develops. In both cases septicemic plague need not be the result, and in particular, not the initial result, but it occasionally happens that bubonic plague for example leads to infection of the blood, and septicemic plague results. If the bacteria happen to enter the bloodstream rather than the lymph or lungs, they multiply in the blood, causing bacteremia and severe sepsis. In septicemic plague, bacterial endotoxins cause disseminated intravascular coagulation (DIC), where tiny blood clots form throughout the body, commonly resulting in localised ischemic necrosis, tissue death from lack of circulation and perfusion.

DIC results in depletion of the body's clotting resources, so that it can no longer control bleeding. Consequently, the unclotted blood bleeds into the skin and other organs, leading to a red or black patchy rash and to hematemesis (vomiting blood) or hemoptysis (coughing up blood). The rash may cause bumps on the skin that look somewhat like insect bites, usually red, sometimes white in the centre.

Septicemic plague is caused by horizontal and direct transmission. Horizontal transmission is the transmitting of a disease from one individual to another regardless of blood relation. Direct transmission occurs from close physical contact with individuals, through common air usage, or from direct bite from a flea or an infected rodent. Most common rodents may carry the bacteria and so may Leporidae such as rabbits.

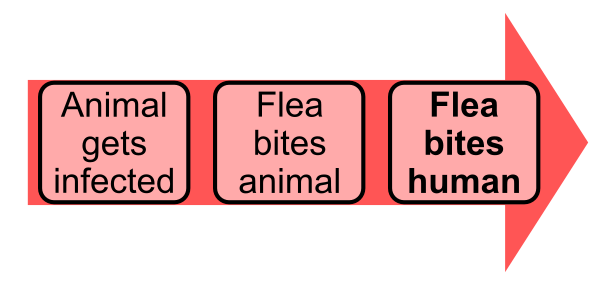

The bacteria are cosmopolitan, mainly in rodents on all continents except Australia and Antarctica. The greatest frequency of human plague infections occurs in Africa. The bacteria most commonly appear in rural areas and wherever there is poor sanitation, overcrowding, and high rodent populations in urban areas. Outdoor activities such as hiking, camping, or hunting where plague-infected animals may be found, increase the risk of contracting septicemic plague, and so do certain occupations such as veterinary or other animal-related work.

== Diagnosis ==
A doctor or veterinarian will perform a physical exam which includes asking about the medical history and possible sources of exposure. The following possible test could include:

- Blood samples (detecting antibodies)
- Culture samples of body fluids (check for the bacteria Yersinia pestis)
- Kidney and liver testing
- Checking lymphatic system for signs of infection
- Examining body fluids for abnormal signs
- Checking for swelling
- Checking for signs of dehydration
- Checking for fever
- Checking for lung infection

=== Differential diagnosis ===
Modern-day cases of plague are very rare, and initial flu-like and gastrointestinal symptoms of septicemic plague are very nonspecific. As a result, plague is usually not suspected until blood cultures confirm presence of Y. pestis. When symptoms of sepsis are present, the differential diagnosis includes other, more common bacterial infections, such as meningococcal disease and bacterial endocarditis. In cases of plague where acute respiratory distress syndrome (ARDS) is present, other respiratory conditions such as hantavirus pulmonary syndrome or SARS may be suspected.

== Prevention ==
The following steps and precautions should be used to avoid infection of the septicemic plague:

- Caregivers of infected patients should wear masks, gloves, goggles and gowns
- Take antibiotics if close contact with the infected patient has occurred
- Use insecticides throughout the house
- Avoid contact with dead rodents or sick cats
- Set traps if mice or rats are present around the house
- Do not allow family pets to roam in areas where plague is common
- Flea control and treatment for animals (especially rodents)

== Treatment ==
Starting antibiotics early is the first step in treating septicemic plague in humans. One of the following antibiotics may be used:

- Streptomycin
- Gentamicin
- Tetracycline or Doxycycline
- Chloramphenicol
- Ciprofloxacin

Lymph nodes may require draining and the patient will need close monitoring.

In animals, antibiotics such as tetracycline or doxycycline can be used. Intravenous drip may be used to assist in dehydration scenarios. Flea treatment can also be used. In some cases, euthanasia may be the best option for treatment and to prevent further spreading.

== Prognosis ==
Untreated, septicemic plague is almost always fatal.

== Epidemiology ==
In 2015, Taylor Gaes, a 16-year-old in Larimer County in northern Colorado, contracted septicemic plague and subsequently died after being bitten by a flea that had bitten a rodent on his family's rural property. Only three people in Colorado had contracted the bacteria in the previous thirty years.

== History ==
The septicemic plague was the least common of the three plague varieties that occurred during the Black Death from 1348 to 1350 (the other two being bubonic plague and pneumonic plague). Like the others, septicemic plague spread from East Asia through trade routes on the Black Sea and down to the Mediterranean Sea.

Major port cities and trade centres such as Venice and Florence were hit the hardest. The massive loss of the working population in Europe following the Black Death, resulting in the increased economic bargaining power of the serf labour force, was a major precipitating factor for the Peasants' Revolt of 1381.

== Other animals ==
Septicemic plague is a zoonosis, a disease that generally is acquired by humans from animals, such as rodents and carnivores. Goats, sheep and camels also may carry the bacteria. Cats rarely develop clinical signs but can be infected and exhibit symptoms such as vomiting or diarrhea. Areas west of the Great Plains of North America are one region where plague-infected animals commonly occur. Plague-infested animals are found in many other countries as well, especially in developing countries where health controls are not effective.

Animals that commonly carry plague bacteria are large rodents and Leporidae, but carnivores sometimes also become infected by their prey. Prey animals are not immune to the disease, and outbreaks of various strains of plague, such as sylvatic plague, have on occasion devastated populations of black-tailed prairie dogs and black-footed ferrets.

Plague has been active in black-tailed prairie dog populations since the 1960s. In the United States outbreaks only occur in the western States and they are devastating, with mortality rates near 100% because the animals have no immunity to the plague. Survivors are the ones that happened not to become infected and colonies that recover from a plague outbreak remain at risk.

Because black-footed ferrets prey on black-tailed prairie dogs, wild ferret populations also fall victim to sylvatic plague. An outbreak can kill nearly 100% of ferrets in a population, and surviving ferrets commonly face starvation because prairie dogs are their main prey. Spray-and-vaccinate campaigns have aimed at preventing the spread of the plague among these animals.

Similar septicemic problems occur in many countries across the world, especially in developing countries where spending on health systems is very low and health controls are not effective.
