= YopH, N-terminal =

YopH_N terminal protein domain
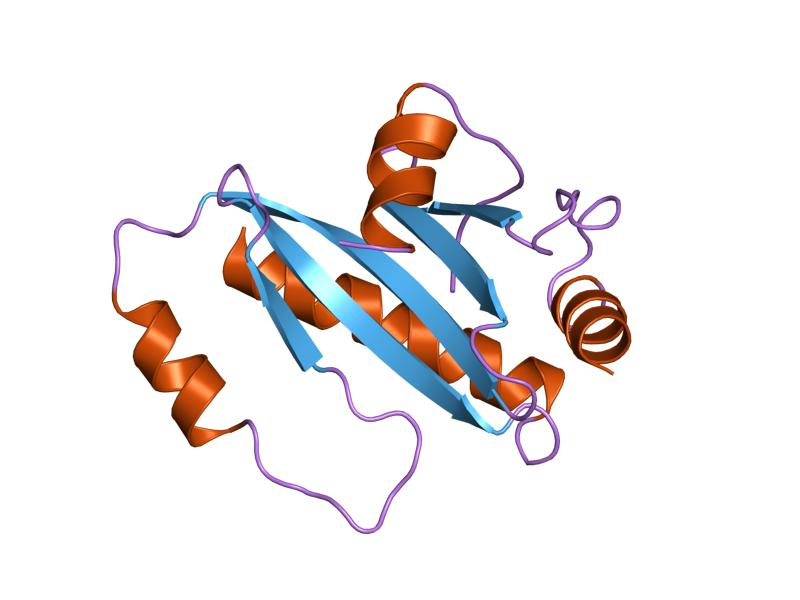
- Crystal structure of the Yersinia pestis type III secretion chaperone sych in complex with a stable fragment of YSCM2

Identifiers
- Symbol: YopH_N
- Pfam: PF09013
- InterPro: IPR015103
Available protein structures:
- Pfam: structures / ECOD
- PDB: RCSB PDB; PDBe; PDBj
- PDBsum: structure summary

In molecular biology, YopH, N-terminal refers to an evolutionary conserved protein domain. This entry represents the N-terminal domain of YopH protein tyrosine phosphatase (PTP).

== Function ==
Protein tyrosine (pTyr) phosphorylation is a common post-translational modification which can create novel recognition motifs for protein interactions and cellular localisation, affect protein stability, and regulate enzyme activity. Consequently, maintaining an appropriate level of protein tyrosine phosphorylation is essential for many cellular functions. Tyrosine-specific protein phosphatases (PTPase; EC) catalyse the removal of a phosphate group attached to a tyrosine residue, using a cysteinyl-phosphate enzyme intermediate. These enzymes are key regulatory components in signal transduction pathways (such as the MAP kinase pathway) and cell cycle control, and are important in the control of cell growth, proliferation, differentiation and transformation.

== Classification ==
The PTP superfamily can be divided into four subfamilies:

1. pTyr-specific phosphatases
2. dual specificity phosphatases (dTyr and dSer/dThr)
3. Cdc25 phosphatases (dTyr and/or dThr)
4. LMW (low molecular weight) phosphatases

Based on their cellular localisation, PTPases are also classified as:

- Receptor-like, which are transmembrane receptors that contain PTPase domains
- Non-receptor (intracellular) PTPases

== Structure ==
This domain has a compact structure composed of four alpha-helices and two beta-hairpins. Helices alpha-1 and alpha-3 are parallel to each other and antiparallel to helices alpha-2 and alpha-4. This domain targets YopH for secretion from the bacterium and translocation into eukaryotic cells, and has phosphotyrosyl peptide-binding activity, allowing for recognition of p130Cas and paxillin. YopH from Yersinia sp. is essential for pathogenesis, as it allows the bacteria to resist phagocytosis by host macrophages through its ability to dephosphorylate host proteins, thereby interfering with the host signalling process. Yersinia has one of the most active PTP enzymes known. YopH contains a loop of ten amino acids (the WPD loop) that covers the entrance of the active site of the enzyme during substrate binding.

All PTPases carry the highly conserved active site motif C(X)5R (PTP signature motif), employ a common catalytic mechanism, and share a similar core structure made of a central parallel beta-sheet with flanking alpha-helices containing a beta-loop-alpha-loop that encompasses the PTP signature motif. Functional diversity between PTPases is endowed by regulatory domains and subunits.

== Homology ==
A homologous domain is found in YscM (Yop secretion protein M), which acts as a Yop protein translocation protein. Several Yop proteins are involved in pathogenesis. YscM is produced by the virulence operon virC, which encodes thirteen genes, yscA-M. Transcription of the virC operon was subjected to the same regulation as the yop genes.
