= Pestilence =

Pestilence may refer to:

- Infectious disease
- Pestilence, one of the Four Horsemen of the Apocalypse
- Pestilence (band), a Dutch death metal group
- Pestilence (comics), a Marvel Comics supervillain, based on the biblical horseman
- "Pestilence" (Medici: Masters of Florence), a television episode
- "The Pestilence", a song by Kreator from Pleasure to Kill
- "The Pestilence" is another name for the Black Death.

== See also ==
- Pestilence wort, a perennial plant native to Europe and northern Asia
- Category:Plague gods
- Pest (disambiguation)
