= PESTS =

American anonymous activist group

PESTS Flyers, 1980s

PESTS was an anonymous American activist group formed in 1986 to critique racism, tokenism, and exclusion in the art world. PESTS produced newsletters, posters, and other print material highlighting examples of discrimination in gallery representation (including lists of New York galleries representing only white artists) and museum exhibitions. PESTS also publicized events and exhibits featuring artists, scholars, and curators of color.

While the members of PESTS are not known, members of the Guerilla Girls have stated that a Black member of Guerrilla Girls founded PESTS. PESTS also used similar tactics, including highlighting statistical data on posters with text graphics. Posters and flyers produced by PESTS included statements such as "THERE ARE AT LEAST 11,009* ARTISTS OF COLOR IN NEW YORK ¿WHY WON'T YOU SEE US?" and "¿WHAT IS TOKENISM (ANSWER) WHEN YOU'VE SEEN ONE ARTIST OF COLOR BUT THINK YOU'VE SEEN TEN." Artist Howardena Pindell, who has highlighted systemic racism in the art world in her personal scholarship and activism, has said that she participated in PESTS.
