= LcrV =

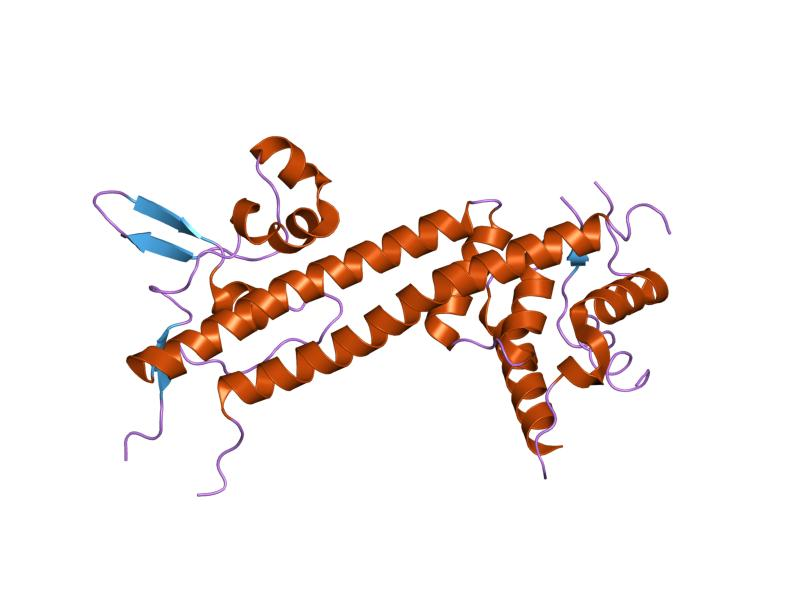
- the structure of yersinia pestis v-antigen, an essential virulence factor and mediator of immunity against plague

Identifiers
- Symbol: LcrV
- Pfam: PF04792
- InterPro: IPR005413
- SCOP2: 1r6f / SCOPe / SUPFAM
Available protein structures:
- PDB: IPR005413 PF04792 (ECOD; PDBsum)
- AlphaFold: IPR005413; PF04792

In molecular biology, LcrV is a protein found in Yersinia pestis and several other bacterial species. It forms part of the Yersinia pestis virulence protein factors that also includes all Yops, or Yersinia outer protein, but the name has been kept out of convention. LcrV's main function is not actually known, but it is essential for the production of other Yops.

The type III secretion system of Gram-negative bacteria is used to transport virulence factors from the pathogen directly into the host cell and is only triggered when the bacterium comes into close contact with the host. Effector proteins secreted by the type III system do not possess a secretion signal, and are considered unique because of this. Yersinia spp. secrete effector proteins called YopB and YopD that facilitate the spread of other translocated proteins through the type III needle and the host cell cytoplasm. In turn, the transcription of these moieties is thought to be regulated by another gene, lcrV, found on the Yops virulon that encodes the entire type III system. The product of this gene, LcrV protein, also regulates the secretion of YopD through the type III translocon, and itself acts as a protective "V" antigen for Yersinia pestis, the causative agent of plague.

A homologue of the Y. pestis LcrV protein, PcrV, has been found in Pseudomonas aeruginosa, an opportunistic pathogen. In vivo studies using mice found that immunisation with the protein protected burned animals from infection by P. aeruginosa, and enhanced survival. In addition, it is speculated that PcrV determines the size of the needle pore for type III secreted effectors.

LcrV is a multifunctional protein that has been shown to act at the level of secretion control by binding the Ysc inner-gate protein LcrG and to modulate the host immune response by altering cytokine production. LcrV is also necessary for full induction of low-calcium response (LCR) stimulon virulence gene transcription.

The polypeptide is encoded on a plasmid and is only present when the surroundings are around 37^{o} Celsius.
