= Pestiš =

Pestiš Пестиш (Serbian)
- Village
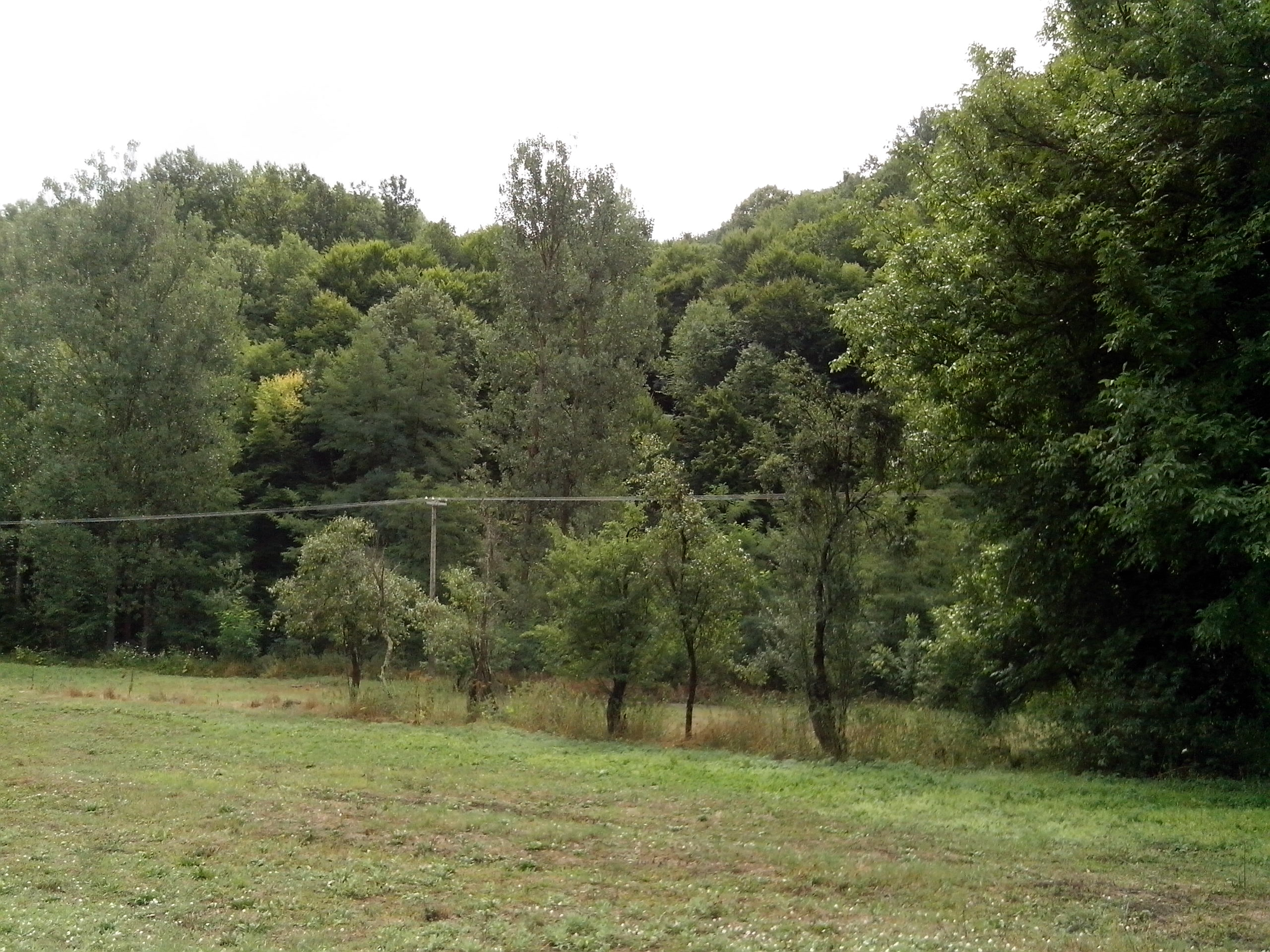

- Location within Serbia
- Coordinates: 43°08′00″N 21°27′49″E
- Country: Serbia
- District: Toplica District
- Municipality: Prokuplje

Population (2002)
  - Total: 22
- Time zone: UTC+1 (CET)
  - Summer (DST): UTC+2 (CEST)

Pestiš is a village in the municipality of Prokuplje, Serbia. According to the 2002 census, the village is entirely populated by Serbs and has a population of 22 people.
