= Plague (disease) =

Disease caused by Yersinia pestis bacterium

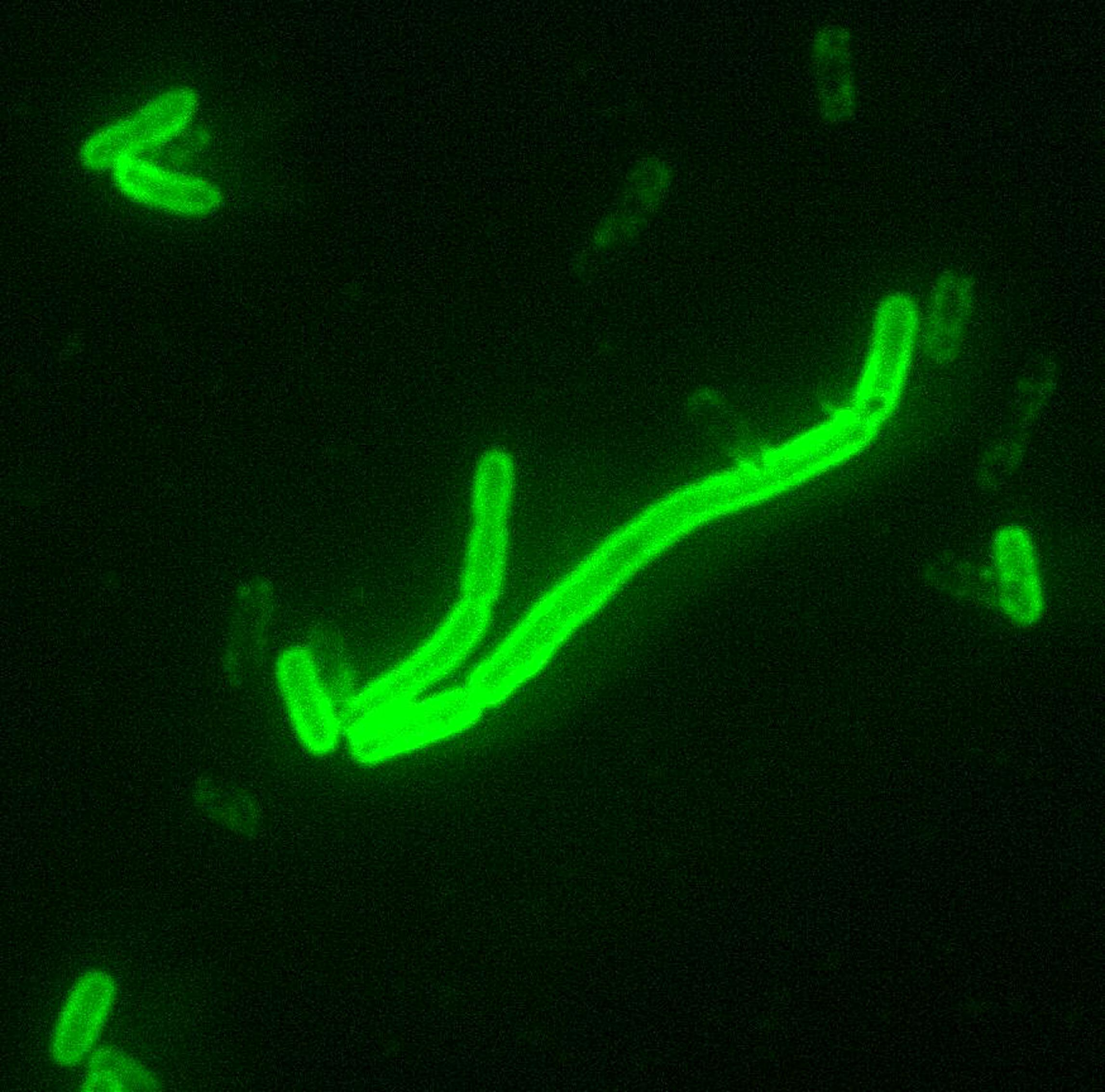
- Yersinia pestis seen at 200× magnification with a fluorescent label.
- Specialty: Infectious disease
- Symptoms: Fever, weakness, headache
- Usual onset: 1–7 days after exposure
- Types: Bubonic plague, septicemic plague, pneumonic plague
- Causes: Yersinia pestis
- Diagnostic method: Finding the bacterium in a lymph node, blood, sputum
- Prevention: Plague vaccine
- Treatment: Antibiotics and supportive care
- Medication: Gentamicin and a fluoroquinolone
- Prognosis: ≈10% risk of death (with treatment)
- Frequency: ≈600 cases a year

Plague is an infectious disease caused by the bacterium Yersinia pestis. Symptoms include fever, weakness, headache and black lips. Usually, this begins one to seven days after exposure. There are three forms of plague, each affecting a different part of the body and causing associated symptoms. Pneumonic plague infects the lungs, causing shortness of breath, coughing and chest pain; bubonic plague affects the lymph nodes, making them swell; and septicemic plague infects the blood and can cause necrosis of tissues.

The bubonic and septicemic forms are generally spread by flea bites or handling an infected animal, whereas pneumonic plague is generally spread between people through the air via infectious droplets. Diagnosis is typically made by finding the bacterium in fluid from a lymph node, blood or sputum.

Vaccination is recommended only for people at high risk of exposure to plague. Those exposed to a case of pneumonic plague may be treated with preventive medication. If infected, treatment is with antibiotics and supportive care. Typically antibiotics include a combination of gentamicin and a fluoroquinolone. The risk of death with treatment is about 10% while without it is about 70%.

Globally, about 600 cases are reported a year. In 2017, the countries with the most cases include the Democratic Republic of the Congo, Madagascar and Peru. In the United States, infections occasionally occur in rural areas, where the bacteria are believed to circulate among rodents. It has historically occurred in large outbreaks, with the best known being the Black Death in the 14th century, which resulted in more than 50 million deaths in Europe.

== Signs and symptoms ==
There are several different clinical manifestations of plague. The most common form is bubonic plague, followed by septicemic and pneumonic plague. Other clinical manifestations include plague meningitis, plague pharyngitis, and ocular plague. General symptoms of plague include fever, chills, headaches, and nausea. Many people experience swelling in their lymph nodes if they have bubonic plague. For those with pneumonic plague, symptoms may (or may not) include a cough, pain in the chest, and haemoptysis.

=== Bubonic plague ===
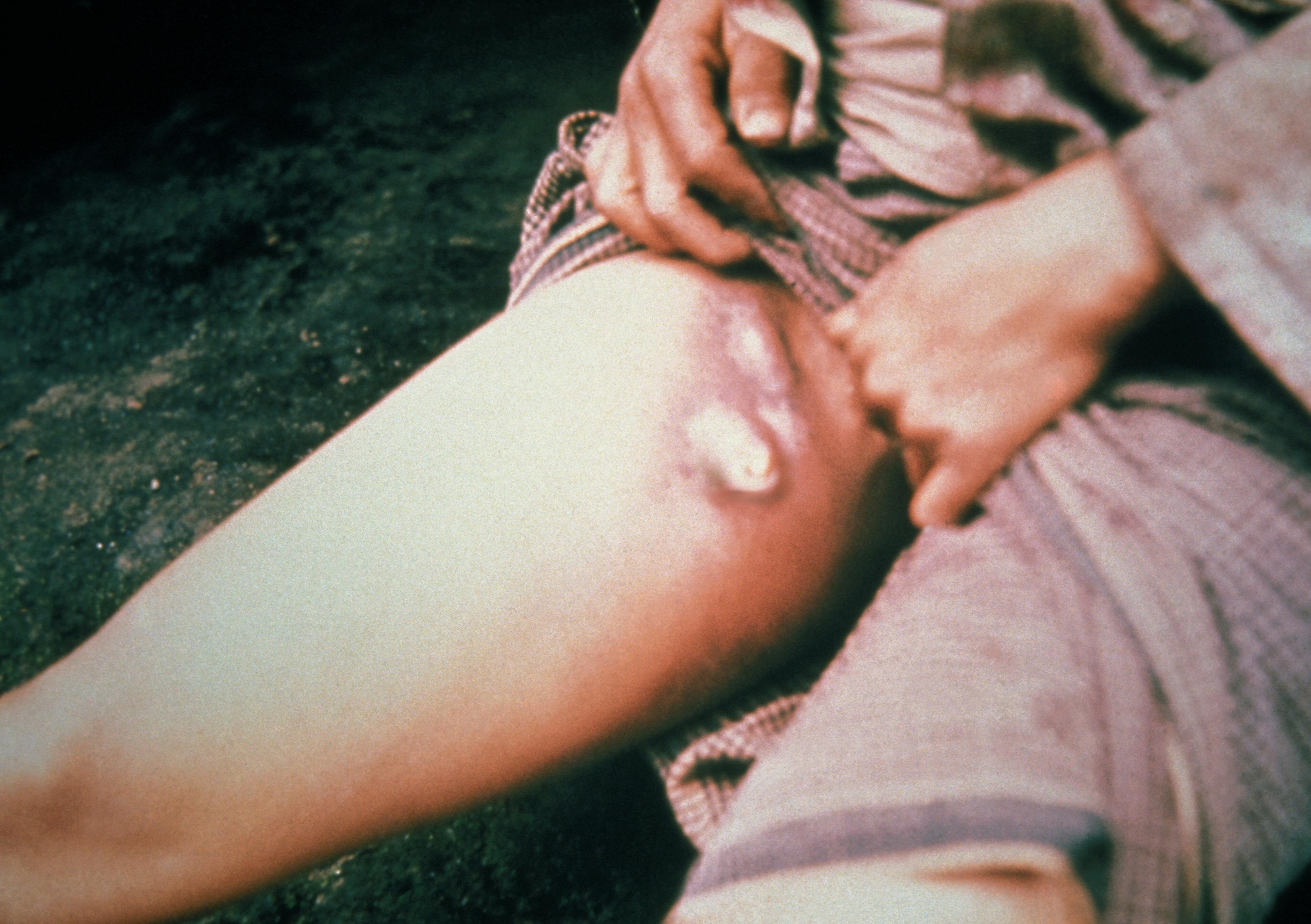
Swollen inguinal lymph glands on a person infected with the bubonic plague. The swollen lymph glands are termed buboes from the Greek word for groin, swollen gland: bubo.

When a flea bites a human and contaminates the wound with regurgitated blood, the plague-causing bacteria are passed into the tissue. Y. pestis can reproduce inside cells, so even if phagocytosed, they can still survive. Once in the body, the bacteria can enter the lymphatic system, which drains interstitial fluid. Plague bacteria secrete several toxins, one of which is known to cause beta-adrenergic blockade.

Y. pestis spreads through the lymphatic vessels of the infected human until it reaches a lymph node, where it causes acute lymphadenitis. The swollen lymph nodes form the characteristic buboes associated with the disease, and autopsies of these buboes have revealed them to be mostly hemorrhagic or necrotic.

If the lymph node is overwhelmed, the infection can pass into the bloodstream, causing secondary septicemic plague, and if the lungs are seeded, it can cause secondary pneumonic plague.

=== Septicemic plague ===
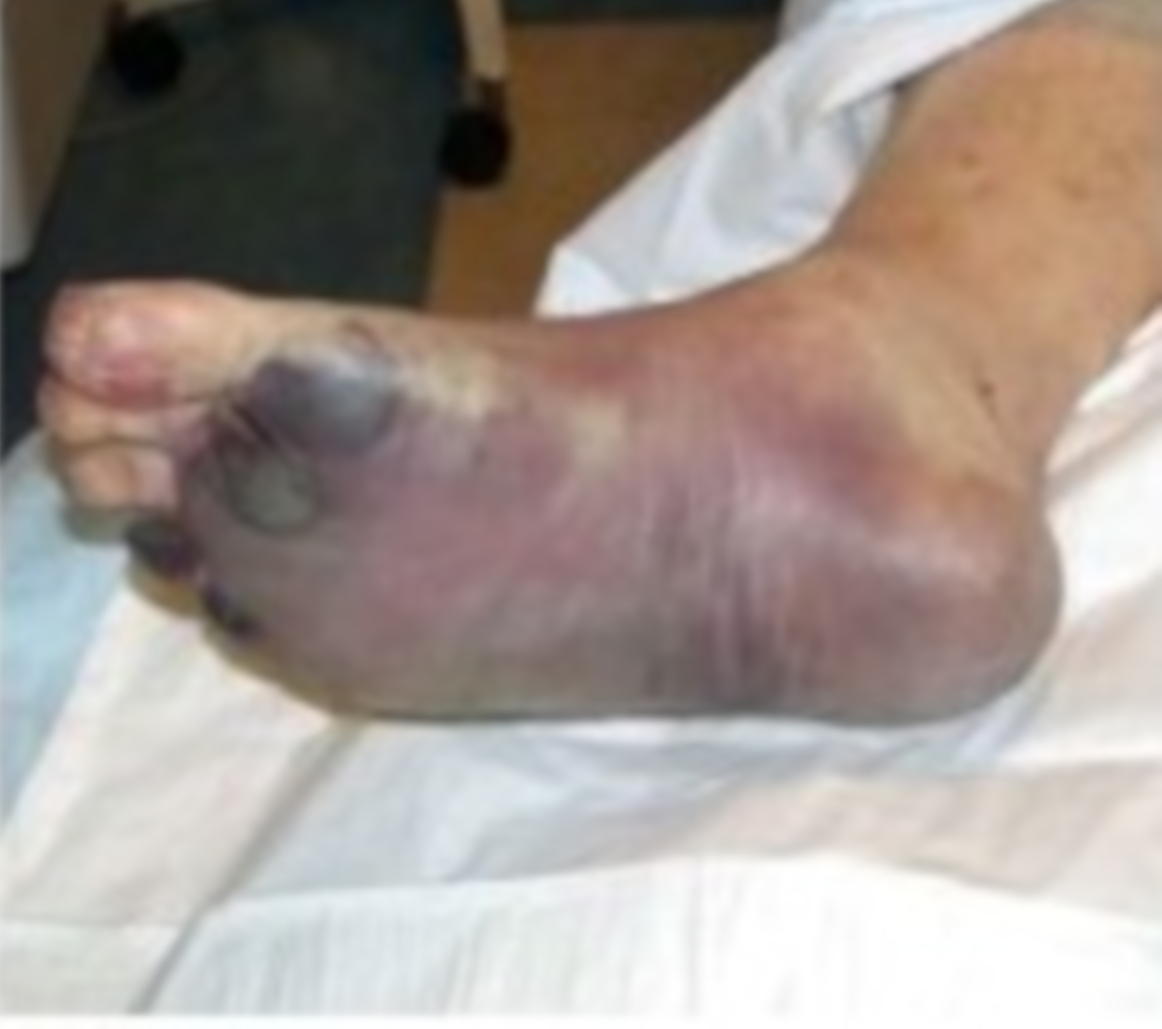
Septicemic plague resulting in necrosis

Lymphatics ultimately drain into the bloodstream, so the plague bacteria may enter the blood and travel to almost any part of the body. In septicemic plague, bacterial endotoxins cause disseminated intravascular coagulation (DIC), causing tiny clots throughout the body and possibly ischemic necrosis, in which tissues die due to a lack of blood circulation. DIC results in depletion of the body's clotting resources so that it can no longer control bleeding. Consequently, there is bleeding into the skin and other organs, which can cause a red or black patchy rash, and coughing up and vomiting of blood. There are bumps on the skin that look somewhat like insect bites; these are usually red, and sometimes white in the centre. Untreated, the septicemic plague is usually fatal. Early treatment with antibiotics reduces the mortality rate to between 4% and 15%.

=== Pneumonic plague ===
The pneumonic form of plague arises from infection of the lungs. It causes coughing and thereby produces airborne droplets that contain bacterial cells and are likely to infect anyone inhaling them. The incubation period for pneumonic plague is short, usually two to four days, but sometimes just a few hours. The initial signs are indistinguishable from several other respiratory illnesses; they include headache, weakness, and spitting or vomiting of blood. The course of the disease is rapid; unless diagnosed and treated soon enough, typically within a few hours, death may follow in one to six days; in untreated cases, mortality is nearly 100%.

== Cause ==
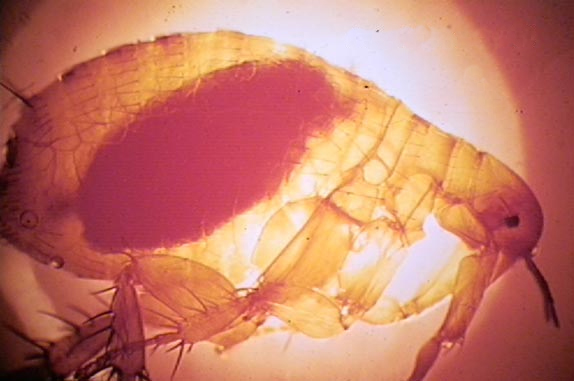
The Oriental rat flea (Xenopsylla cheopis) engorged with blood after a blood meal. This species of flea is the primary vector for the transmission of Yersinia pestis, the organism responsible for bubonic plague in most plague epidemics in Asia, Africa, and South America. Both male and female fleas feed on blood and can transmit the infection.

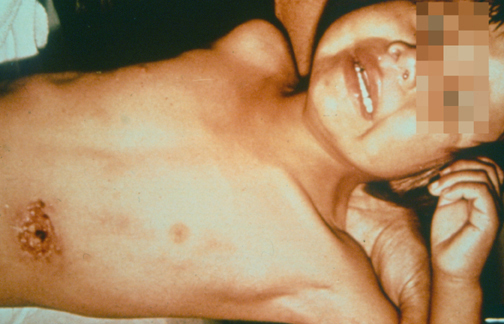
A child bitten by a flea infected with the bacterium Yersinia pestis. Y. pestis, a member of the family Yersiniaceae, has caused the bite to become ulcerated.

Transmission of Y. pestis to an uninfected individual is possible by any of the following means:

- droplet contact – coughing or sneezing on another person
- direct physical contact – touching an infected person, including sexual contact
- indirect contact – usually by touching soil contamination or a contaminated surface
- airborne transmission – if the microorganism can remain in the air for long periods
- fecal-oral transmission – usually from contaminated food or water sources
- vector borne transmission – carried by insects or other animals.

Yersinia pestis circulates in animal reservoirs, particularly in rodents, in the natural foci of infection found on all continents except Australia. The natural foci of plague are situated in a broad belt in the tropical and sub-tropical latitudes and the warmer parts of the temperate latitudes around the globe, between the parallels 55° N and 40° S. Contrary to popular belief, rats did not directly start the spread of the bubonic plague. It is mainly a disease in the fleas (Xenopsylla cheopis) that infested the rats, making the rats themselves the first victims of the plague. Rodent-borne infection in a human occurs when a person is bitten by a flea that has been infected by biting a rodent that itself has been infected by the bite of a flea carrying the disease. The bacteria multiply inside the flea, sticking together to form a plug that blocks its stomach and causes it to starve. The flea then bites a host and continues to feed, even though it cannot quell its hunger, and consequently, the flea vomits blood tainted with the bacteria back into the bite wound. The bubonic plague bacterium then infects a new person and the flea eventually dies from starvation. Serious outbreaks of plague are usually started by other disease outbreaks in rodents or a rise in the rodent population.

The Tarbagan marmot is a natural host for plague in parts of Mongolia, Russia and China.

A 21st-century study of a 1665 outbreak of plague in the village of Eyam in England's Derbyshire Dales – which isolated itself during the outbreak, facilitating modern study – found that three-quarters of cases are likely to have been due to human-to-human transmission, especially within families, a much larger proportion than previously thought.

== Diagnosis ==
Symptoms of plague are usually non-specific, necessitating laboratory testing to definitively diagnose the disease. Y. pestis can be identified through both a microscope and by culturing a sample and this is used as a reference standard to confirm that a person has a case of plague. The sample can be obtained from the blood, mucus (sputum), or aspirate extracted from inflamed lymph nodes (buboes). If a person is administered antibiotics before a sample is taken or if there is a delay in transporting the person's sample to a laboratory and/or a poorly stored sample, there is a possibility for false negative results.

Polymerase chain reaction (PCR) may also be used to diagnose plague, by detecting the presence of bacterial genes such as the pla gene (plasmogen activator) and caf1 gene, (F1 capsule antigen). PCR testing requires a very small sample and is effective for both alive and dead bacteria. For this reason, if a person receives antibiotics before a sample is collected for laboratory testing, they may have a false negative culture and a positive PCR result.

Blood tests to detect antibodies against Y. pestis can also be used to diagnose plague, however, this requires taking blood samples at different periods to detect differences between the acute and convalescent phases of F1 antibody titres.

In 2020, a study about rapid diagnostic tests that detect the F1 capsule antigen (F1RDT) by sampling sputum or bubo aspirate was released. Results show rapid diagnostic F1RDT test can be used for people who have suspected pneumonic and bubonic plague but cannot be used in asymptomatic people. F1RDT may be useful in providing a fast result for prompt treatment and fast public health response as studies suggest that F1RDT is highly sensitive for both pneumonic and bubonic plague. However, when using the rapid test, both positive and negative results need to be confirmed to establish or reject the diagnosis of a confirmed case of plague and the test result needs to be interpreted within the epidemiological context as study findings indicate that although 40 out of 40 people who had the plague in a population of 1000 were correctly diagnosed, 317 people were diagnosed falsely as positive.

== Prevention ==
=== Vaccination ===
Bacteriologist Waldemar Haffkine developed the first plague vaccine in 1897. He conducted a massive inoculation program in British India, and it is estimated that 26 million doses of Haffkine's anti-plague vaccine were sent out from Bombay between 1897 and 1925, reducing the plague mortality by 50–85%.

Since human plague is rare in most parts of the world as of 2023, routine vaccination is not needed other than for those at particularly high risk of exposure, nor for people living in areas with enzootic plague, meaning it occurs at regular, predictable rates in populations and specific areas, such as the western United States. It is not even indicated for most travellers to countries with known recent reported cases, particularly if their travel is limited to urban areas with modern hotels. The United States CDC thus only recommends vaccination for (1) all laboratory and field personnel who are working with Y. pestis organisms resistant to antimicrobials: (2) people engaged in aerosol experiments with Y. pestis; and (3) people engaged in field operations in areas with enzootic plague where preventing exposure is not possible (such as some disaster areas). A systematic review by the Cochrane Collaboration found no studies of sufficient quality to make any statement on the efficacy of the vaccine.

=== Early diagnosis ===
Diagnosing plague early leads to a decrease in transmission or spread of the disease.

=== Prophylaxis ===
Pre-exposure prophylaxis for first responders and health care providers who will care for patients with pneumonic plague is not considered necessary as long as standard and droplet precautions can be maintained. In cases of surgical mask shortages, patient overcrowding, poor ventilation in hospital wards, or other crises, pre-exposure prophylaxis might be warranted if sufficient supplies of antimicrobials are available.

Postexposure prophylaxis should be considered for people who had close (<6 feet), sustained contact with a patient with pneumonic plague and were not wearing adequate personal protective equipment. Antimicrobial postexposure prophylaxis also can be considered for laboratory workers accidentally exposed to infectious materials and people who had close (<6 feet) or direct contact with infected animals, such as veterinary staff, pet owners, and hunters.

Specific recommendations on pre- and post-exposure prophylaxis are available in the clinical guidelines on treatment and prophylaxis of plague published in 2021.

== Treatments ==
If diagnosed in time, the various forms of plague are usually highly responsive to antibiotic therapy. The antibiotics often used are streptomycin, chloramphenicol and tetracycline. Amongst the newer generation of antibiotics, gentamicin and doxycycline have proven effective in monotherapeutic treatment of plague. Guidelines on treatment and prophylaxis of plague were published by the Centers for Disease Control and Prevention in 2021.

The plague bacterium could develop drug resistance and again become a major health threat. One case of a drug-resistant form of the bacterium was found in Madagascar in 1995. Further outbreaks in Madagascar were reported in November 2014 and October 2017.

== Epidemiology ==
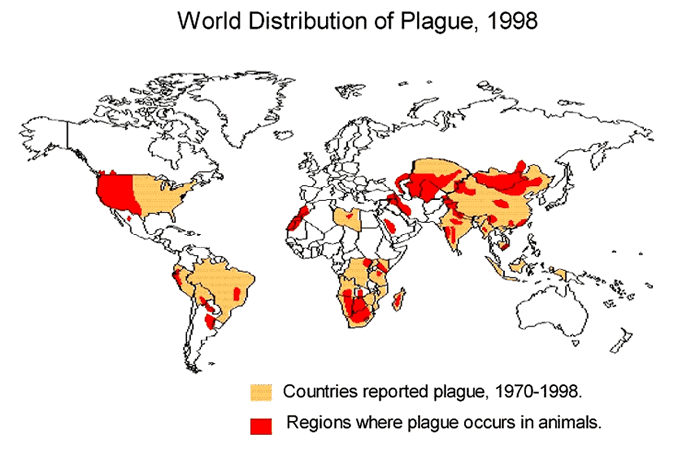
Distribution of plague-infected animals 1998

Globally about 600 cases are reported a year. In 2017, the countries with the most cases include the Democratic Republic of the Congo, Madagascar and Peru. It has historically occurred in large outbreaks, with the best known being the Black Death in the 14th century which resulted in more than 50 million dead. In recent years, cases have been distributed between small seasonal outbreaks which occur primarily in Madagascar, and sporadic outbreaks or isolated cases in endemic areas.

In 2022, the possible origin of all modern strains of Yersinia pestis was found in DNA in human remains in three graves located in Kyrgyzstan, dated to 1338 and 1339. The first recorded occurrence of the Black Death occurred shortly thereafter during the siege of Caffa in Crimea in 1346, and was carried to Europe by boat by people attempting to escape the disease. The strain was identified as the most recent common ancestor of both strains found in historic graves and currently existing strains. Bacteria affecting marmots in modern-day Kyrgyzstan are the closest genetically (compared to samples from infected rodents worldwide) to the strain found in the graves, suggesting this is also the location where plague transferred from animals to humans.

== Biological weapon ==
The plague has a long history as a biological weapon. Historical accounts from ancient China and medieval Europe details the use of infected animal carcasses, such as cows or horses, and human carcasses, by the Xiongnu/Huns, Mongols, Turks and other groups, to contaminate enemy water supplies. Han dynasty general Huo Qubing is recorded to have died of such contamination while engaging in warfare against the Xiongnu. Plague victims were also reported to have been tossed by catapult into cities under siege.

In 1347, the Genoese possession of Caffa, a great trade emporium on the Crimean peninsula, came under siege by an army of Mongol warriors of the Golden Horde under the command of Jani Beg. After a protracted siege during which the Mongol army was reportedly withering from the disease, they decided to use the infected corpses as a biological weapon. The corpses were catapulted over the city walls, infecting the inhabitants. This event might have led to the transfer of the Black Death via their ships into the south of Europe, possibly explaining its rapid spread.

During World War II, the Imperial Japanese Army developed weaponized plague, based on the breeding and release of large numbers of fleas. During the Japanese occupation of Manchuria, Unit 731 deliberately infected Chinese, Korean and Manchurian civilians and prisoners of war with the plague bacterium. These subjects, termed "maruta" or "logs", were then studied by dissection, others by vivisection while still conscious. Members of the unit such as Shirō Ishii were exonerated from the Tokyo tribunal by Douglas MacArthur but 12 of them were prosecuted in the Khabarovsk War Crime Trials in 1949 during which some admitted having spread bubonic plague within a 36-kilometre (22 mi) radius around the city of Changde.

Ishii innovated bombs containing live mice and fleas, with very small explosive loads, to deliver the weaponized microbes, overcoming the problem of the explosive killing the infected animal and insect by the use of a ceramic, rather than metal, casing for the warhead. While no records survive of the actual usage of the ceramic shells, prototypes exist and are believed to have been used in experiments during WWII.

After World War II, both the United States and the Soviet Union developed means of weaponising pneumonic plague. Experiments included various delivery methods, vacuum drying, sizing the bacterium, developing strains resistant to antibiotics, combining the bacterium with other diseases (such as diphtheria), and genetic engineering. Scientists who worked in USSR bio-weapons programs have stated that the Soviet effort was formidable and that large stocks of weaponised plague bacteria were produced. Information on many of the Soviet and US projects is largely unavailable. Aerosolized pneumonic plague remains the most significant threat.

The plague can be easily treated with antibiotics. Some countries, such as the United States, have large supplies on hand if such an attack should occur, making the threat less severe.

== See also ==
- Timeline of plague
