= Pneumonic plague =

Severe lung infection

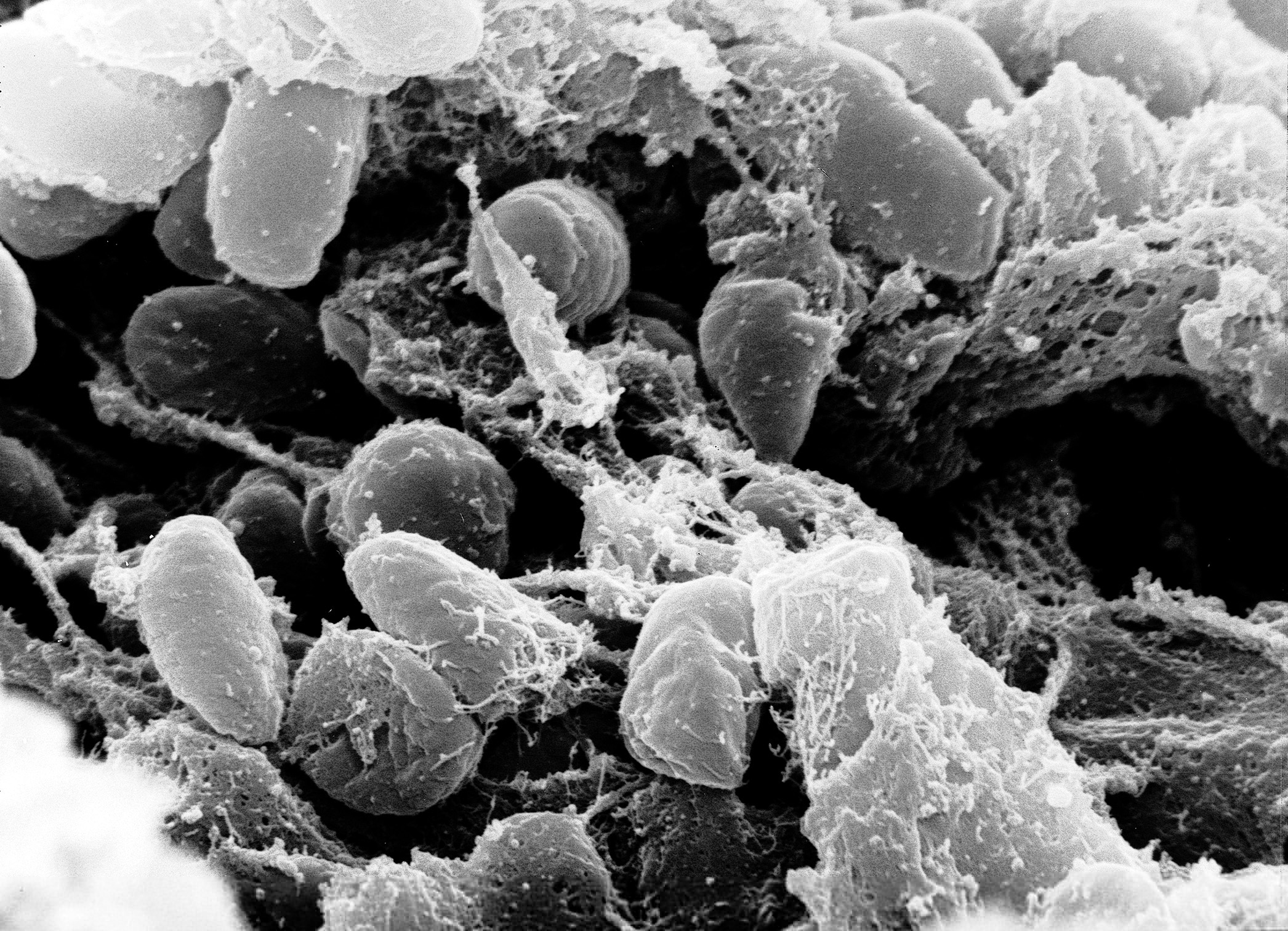
- A scanning electron micrograph depicting a mass of Yersinia pestis bacteria
- Pronunciation: /njuːˈmɒnɪk pleɪɡ/ (British English) /nuːˈmɑːnɪk pleɪɡ/ (American English)
- Specialty: Infectious disease
- Symptoms: Fever, headache, dyspnoea, coughing up blood
- Usual onset: 3 to 7 days
- Causes: Yersinia pestis
- Risk factors: Airborne respiratory transmission, rodents
- Diagnostic method: Sputum culture
- Differential diagnosis: Pneumococcal pneumonia, tularemia, anthrax
- Treatment: Antibiotics
- Medication: Streptomycin, gentamicin, ciprofloxacin, levofloxacin, moxifloxacin, doxycycline, chloramphenicol
- Prognosis: Nearly 100% fatal if untreated
- Frequency: 3% of all plague cases (CDC MMWR 2015)

Pneumonic plague is a severe lung infection caused by the bacterium Yersinia pestis. Pneumonic plague is one of three forms of plague and the most deadly manifestation; the other two being bubonic plague and septicemic plague.The disease starts with unspecific symptoms including Influenza-like symptoms, fever or headache, muscle aches and malaise, that last 1–3 days. Then, it progresses rapidly to respiratory symptoms like shortness of breath, chest pain, and coughing up blood. This sputum is highly contagious. Symptoms typically start about three to seven days after exposure.

Pneumonic plague is the only form of human-to-human transmission and occurs by inhalation of aerosolized respiratory droplets from infected patients or animals (airborne transmission). Secondary pneumonic plague may occur following an initial bubonic or septicemic plague infection. The factor that differs among the three forms of plague is the location of infection; in pneumonic plague the infection is in the lungs, in bubonic plague the lymph nodes, and in septicemic plague within the blood . Diagnosis is by testing the blood, sputum, or fluid from a lymph node.

The causative agent of plague, Yersinia pestis, belongs to Enterobacterales Order and Yersiniaceae family, which presents both pathogenic and non-pathogenic species. Among pathogenic species, there are Y. pestis, Y. pseudotuberculosis and Y. enterocolitica. These pathogenic species have evolved from non-pathogenic strains by acquisition of several virulence plasmids. In the case of Yersinia pestis, causative agent of plague, non-pathogenic predecessors acquired three plasmids; pYV, pPLA and pMT1 plasmids.

- The pYV plasmid encodes the type III secretion system (T3SS) that presents the outer proteins (Yops), the V antigen (LcrV) and the yersiniabactin siderophore system gene (Ybt). The first two are immunomodulators while Ybt is involved in iron capture from the blood.
- The pPLA and pMT1 plasmids are essential for pathogenicity of Yersinia pestis; pPLA plasmid encodes the plasminogen activator protease (pla), which promotes bacterial spread by breaking down fibrin clots and extracellular matrix aiding tissue invasion, and pMT1 plasmid encodes the murine toxin (Ymt), important for survival in the flea midgut and thus for flea-borne transmission. It also carries the F1 capsule antigen, which helps bacteria to resist phagocytosis in mammals.

Yersinia pestis and Yersinia pseudotuberculosis originated from the same evolutionary branch, but due to gene loss, they were divided into 2 different species. Yersinia pseudotuberculosis does not present the ability of forming biofilms; transcription of hemin storage (hms) gene is repressed by RcsAB and PDE, which degrades cyclic-di-GMP, the activator molecule for hms transcription. However, in Yersinia pestis, PDE and RcsAB genes are deleted, so hms is overexpressed by c-di-GMP forming biofilms. Biofilm formation in the gut if rat fleas (Xenopsylla cheopis) is essential for transmission of Yersinia pestis.

While vaccines are being developed, in most countries they are not yet commercially available. Plague is present among rodents in Africa, the Americas, and Asia. The total reported number of cases of all types of plague in 2013 was 783.

Pneumonic plague can be prevented by avoiding contact with infected people and animals, and by the use of correctly fitted N95 masks. It is recommended that those infected be isolated from others. Treatment of pneumonic plague consists of antibiotics.

Pneumonic plague is more serious and less common than the bubonic form. if it is not treated, pneumonic plague is almost always fatal (100%).

Some hypothesize that the pneumonic version of the plague was mainly responsible for the Black Death that resulted in approximately 25–50 million deaths in Europe in the 1300s.

== Signs and symptoms ==
The most apparent symptom of pneumonic plague is coughing, often with hemoptysis (coughing up blood). With pneumonic plague, the first signs of illness are fever, headache, weakness, and rapidly developing pneumonia with shortness of breath, chest pain, cough, and sometimes bloody or watery sputum.

The pneumonia associated with pneumonic plague progresses for two to four days and may cause respiratory failure and shock. Patients will die without early treatment, some within 36 hours.

Initial pneumonic plague symptoms often may include the following:

- Fever
- Weakness
- Headaches
- Nausea

Rapidly developing pneumonia with:

- Shortness of breath
- Chest pain
- Cough
- Bloody or watery sputum (saliva and discharge from respiratory passages).

=== Bioweapon ===
Pneumonic plague is the form of plague that is used as a bioweapon, as it is transmitted among humans. It is classified by the Centers for Disease Control and Prevention (CDC) as a Category A biologic agent for potential bioterrorism; it can be released and spread easily, which creates a major public health hazard and could lead to quarantines and potentially widespread economic devastation. Pneumonic plague leads to death rapidly without prompt recognition and treatment and incites fear among population because of its symptoms.

Pneumonic form of Yersinia pestis has been used as a bioweapon in several occasions:

1. Siege of Caffa – used by Tatars (1346). It was a military conflict where the Mongolians were sieging the city of Caffa, which was part of the Republic of Genoa. The Tatars suffered an epidemic of Black Death (Bubonic plague) in their camp, so they catapulted plague-ridden infected corpses within the city of Caffa and the disease rapidly spread among the population. This action attracted nests of rodents that helped to spread the plague. It is the first recorded use of biological agents to wage war.
2. Second World War (WWII) – used by Unit 73146 and 73147 of the Imperial Japanese Army. Japanese warplanes dropped plague-contaminated rice and wheat with fleas into China. Inhabitants ingested contaminated food and got infected by flea bites, which caused an outbreak of pneumonic plague.

== Causes ==
Pneumonic plague may be caused in two ways: primarily through transmission via the inhalation of aerosolized plague bacteria, or secondarily when infection by septicemic plague spreads into lung tissue from the bloodstream.

Pneumonic plague may be spread from person to person. There have been cases of pneumonic plague resulting from the dissection or handling of contaminated animal tissue. This is one of the types of plague formerly known as the Black Death. Its transmission is different from bubonic plague that is exclusively vector-borne.

== Treatment ==
Pneumonic plague is a very aggressive infection that requires early treatment within the first 24 to 36 hours of the onset of symptoms to prevent death. Treatment should be started after the first symptoms appear to reduce the risk of death. Streptomycin, gentamicin, tetracyclines, and chloramphenicol are the types of antibiotics used to treat the causative bacterium.

Antibiotic treatment for seven days will protect people who have had direct, close contact with infected patients. Wearing a correctly fitted N95 mask may also protect against infection. Antibiotic treatment may worsen patient conditions or cause death in cases of Y. pestis designs that had been combined with other toxins or viruses, as the latter would be released upon cell lysis; such designs had been created at Biopreparat in the 1980s.

The mortality rate from untreated pneumonic plague approaches 100%, although victims of the Black Death who vomited blood occasionally survived, such as the chronicler Marcha di Marco Battagli.

== Modern outbreaks ==
Since 2002, the World Health Organization (WHO) has reported seven plague outbreaks, however, some may go unreported because they often happen in remote areas. Between 1998 and 2009, nearly 24,000 cases were reported, including approximately 2,000 deaths, in Africa, Asia, the Americas, and Eastern Europe. Ninety-eight percent of the world's cases occur in Africa.

=== Democratic Republic of the Congo ===
Two outbreaks occurred in the Democratic Republic of the Congo in 2005 and 2006. The outbreak in 2005 was only detected by examination of blood samples after the outbreak became recognized. The total death toll was 111.

=== India ===
In September 1994, India experienced an outbreak of plague that killed 50 and caused travel to New Delhi by air to be suspended until the outbreak was brought under control. The outbreak was feared to be much worse because the plague superficially resembles other common diseases such as influenza and bronchitis; more than 200 people who had been quarantined were released when they did not test positive for the plague. All but three of the deaths occurred around the city of Surat.

=== China ===
A major outbreak of the pneumonic plague occurred in Manchuria from 1910 to 1911, in what became known as the Manchurian plague, killing approximately 60,000 people. The Qing court dispatched Wu Lien-teh, a physician educated at Cambridge University, to oversee disease control and treatment efforts. He made the novel observation that the disease was transmitted by air and he developed prototypical respirators to help prevent its spread. A second, less deadly outbreak occurred in 1920–21, killing approximately 9,300 people.

The People's Republic of China has eradicated pneumonic plague from most parts of the country, but still reports occasional cases in remote western areas, where the disease is carried by rats and the marmots living across the Himalayan plateau. Outbreaks may be caused when a person eats an infected marmot or comes into contact with fleas carried by rats. A 2006 WHO report from an international meeting on plague cited a Chinese government disease expert as saying that most cases of the plague in China's northwest occur when hunters are contaminated while skinning infected animals.

The expert said at the time that, due to the region's remoteness, the disease killed more than half the infected people. The report also said that since the 1990s, there was a rise in plague cases in humans, from fewer than 10 in the 1980s, to nearly 100 cases in 1996, and to 254 in 2000. In September 2008, two people in East Tibet died of pneumonic plague.

An outbreak of the disease in China began in August 2009 in Ziketan Town located in Qinghai Province. The town was sealed off and several people died as a result of the disease. According to spokesperson Vivian Tan of the WHO office in Beijing, "In cases like this [in August 2009], we encourage the authorities to identify cases, to investigate any suspicious symptoms among close contacts, and to treat confirmed cases as soon as possible. So far, they have done exactly that. There have been sporadic cases reported around the country in the last few years so the authorities do have the experience to deal with this."

In September 2010, five cases of pneumonic plague were reported in Tibet.

In July 2014, Chinese media reported one case found in Gansu.

On 12 November 2019, it was announced that two people from the Chinese province of Inner Mongolia were diagnosed with pneumonic plague. They received treatment in Chaoyang District, Beijing and authorities implemented preventative control measures. Later in November, a third case of plague was confirmed. A 55-year-old man was diagnosed with bubonic plague after eating wild rabbit in Inner Mongolia. The region's health commission says it has no evidence to suggest that this case is linked to the previous two. By the end of November, a fourth case was confirmed. Chinese health authorities reported a fresh case of bubonic plague in the country's northern Inner Mongolia region, bringing the total number of reported plague cases originating from Inner Mongolia to four.

=== Peru ===
In August 2010, Peru's health minister, Oscar Ugarte, announced that an outbreak of plague had killed a 14-year-old boy and had infected at least 31 people in a northern coastal province. The boy died of bubonic plague on 26 July 2010. Ugarte stated that authorities were screening sugar and fish meal exports from Ascope Province, located about 325 miles (520 km) northwest of Lima, not far from the popular Chicama beach. Most of the infections in Peru were bubonic plague, with four cases and two deaths of pneumonic plague (50%) (25 cases and 1 death of bubonic plague, 2 cases and deaths of septicemic plague).

The first recorded plague outbreak in Peru was in 1903. Before the above case, the last known outbreak was in 1994, killing 35 people.

=== Madagascar ===
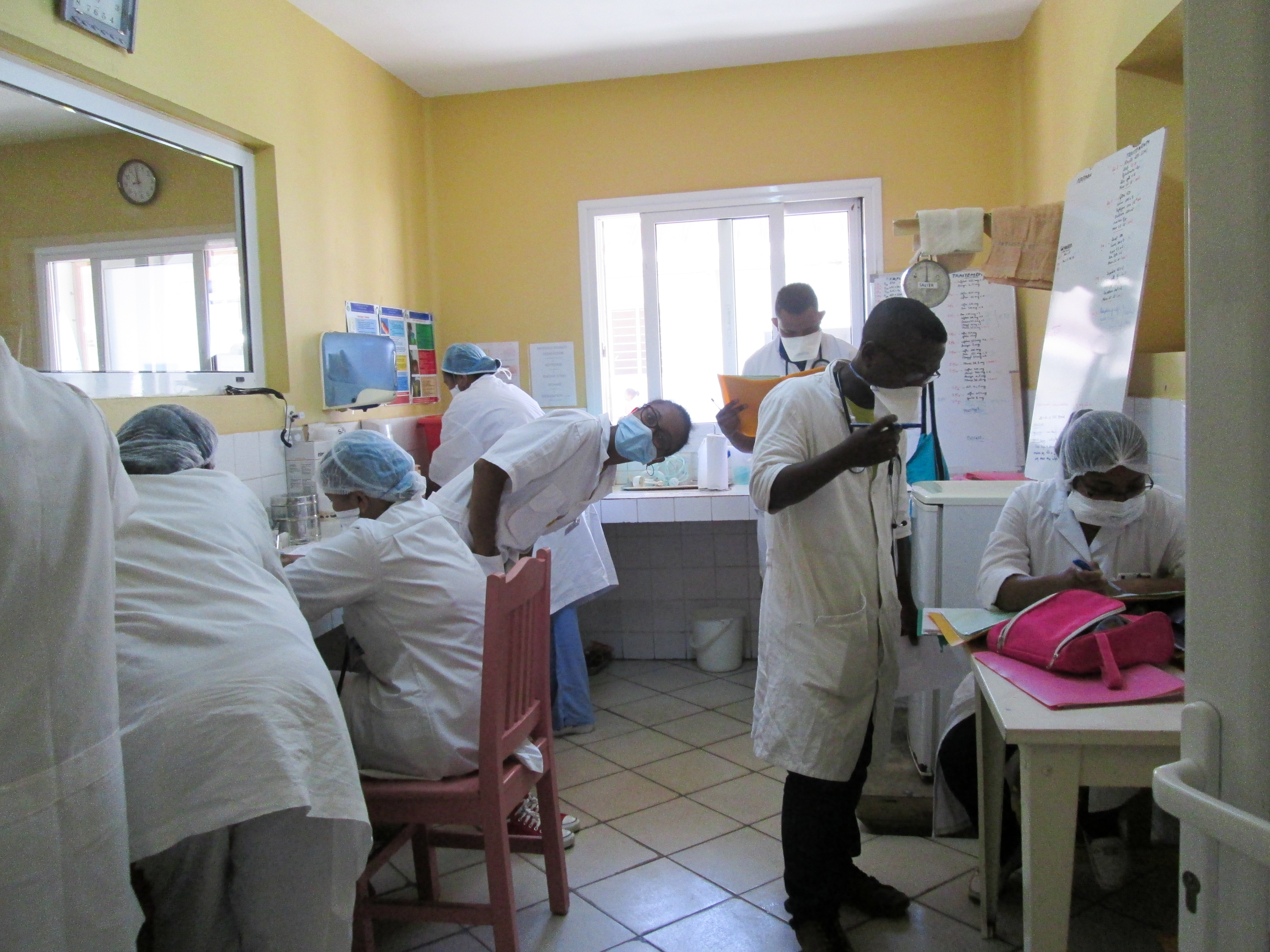
Medical team working together during a plague outbreak in Madagascar (October 2017)

In November 2013, an outbreak of plague occurred in the African island nation of Madagascar. As of 16 December, at least 89 people were infected and 39 deaths occurred. Initially, at least two cases were reported as pneumonic plague, however, as many as 90% of cases were later reported to have involved pneumonic plague.

From 23 August to 30 September 2017, a total of 73 suspected, probable, and confirmed cases of pneumonic plague, including 17 deaths, were reported in Madagascar. The diagnosis was confirmed by the Institut Pasteur de Madagascar using a polymerase chain reaction test, while field health workers used a Rapid Diagnostic Test. The WHO and Institut Pasteur de Madagascar were both involved in administering antibiotic compounds and attempting to stop the spread of the disease. By mid-October, there were an estimated 684 confirmed cases of plague that included 474 pneumonic, 156 bubonic, and one septicemic. The remainder were not classified. At least 74 deaths have been ascribed to pneumonic plague.

The outbreak officially ended on 26 November 2017 with 2,348 cases and 202 deaths officially reported.

=== United States ===
In the fall of 1924, an outbreak occurred in Los Angeles that killed 30 people (of the 37 cases).

On 2 November 2007, wildlife biologist Eric York died of pneumonic plague in Grand Canyon National Park. York was exposed to the bacteria while conducting a necropsy on a cougar carcass.

In 2014, the Colorado Department of Public Health and Environment confirmed that a Colorado man had been diagnosed with pneumonic plague, the first confirmed human case in Colorado in more than ten years, and one of only 60 cases since 1957. The man was found to have the disease after the family dog died unexpectedly and a necropsy revealed that pneumonic plague was the cause. Three additional pneumonic plague cases were confirmed in Colorado before the outbreak ended.

A person near Flagstaff, Arizona, died of pneumonic plague in July 2025.

== The plague incident in Russia ==
In early October 2026, 28-year-old Daria Shipilova, a laboratory technician at the Irkutsk Anti-Plague Research Institute of Siberia and the Far East, died in a Shelekhov hospital from pneumonia of unknown origin, prompting speculation about a possible plague outbreak. The hospital was quarantined, and at least 197 people were put under observation. Several other local hospitals, including the children's hospital, began enforcing a three-week quarantine, and public events in the city were cancelled.
