= Sputum =

Mucus that is coughed up from the lower airways

Abnormal sputum
- Other names: Mucus
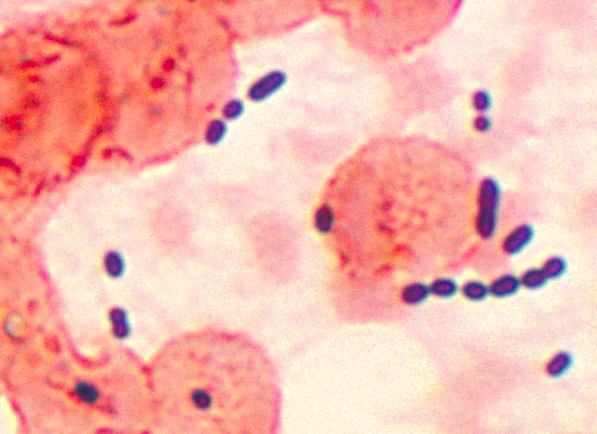
- Cocci-shaped Enterococcus sp. bacteria taken from a pneumonia patient
- Pronunciation: /'spju:təm/
- Specialty: Pulmonology

Sputum is mucus that is coughed up from the lower airways (the trachea and bronchi). It is commonly referred to as "phlegm". In medicine, sputum samples are usually used for a naked-eye examination, microbiological investigation of respiratory infections, and cytological investigations of respiratory system.

These naked-eye examinations have been found to be successful, but are subjective to the examiner (in a professional setting, a clinician). Current technologies exist that can analyze sputum more objectively, but are often expensive, complex, or difficult to use.

A naked eye exam of the sputum can be done at home by a patient in order to note the various colors (see below). Any hint of yellow or green color (pus) suggests an airway infection (but does not indicate the type of organism causing it). Such color hints are best detected when the sputum is viewed against a bright white background, such as white paper, a white pot, or a white sink surface.

Having green, yellow, or thickened phlegm (sputum) does not always indicate the presence of an infection. Also, if an infection is present, the color of the phlegm (sputum) does not determine whether a virus, a bacterium or another pathogen has caused it. Simple allergies can also cause changes in the color of mucus.

== Description ==
The best sputum samples contain very little saliva, as saliva contaminates the sample with oral bacteria. This is especially true for samples for laboratory testing in cytology or microbiology. Specimen adequacy is assessed by the laboratory technologists by examining a Gram stain or cytology stain of the sputum. More than 25 squamous epithelial cells at low power magnification exam under the microscope strongly suggest salivary contamination. Sputum samples have been used to quantify the degree of airway inflammation in human diseases such as asthma. Specifically, this work has demonstrated that a subgroup of severe asthma patients has airway inflammation that is resistant to treatment with corticosteroids.

When a sputum specimen is plated out in microbiology, it is best to get the portion of the sample that almost looks like yellow pus onto the swab. If there is any blood in the sputum, this should also be on the swab. Microbiological sputum samples are used to look for infections, such as Moraxella catarrhalis, Mycobacterium tuberculosis, Streptococcus pneumoniae, and Haemophilus influenzae. Other pathogens can also be found.

Purulent sputum contains pus, composed of white blood cells, cellular debris, dead tissue, serous fluid, and viscous liquid (mucus). Purulent sputum is typically yellow or green. It is seen in cases of pneumonia, bronchiectasis, lung abscess, or an advanced stage of bronchitis.

== Interpretation ==
Sputum can be (when examined by the naked eye):

- Bloody (hemoptysis)
  - Blood-streaked sputum –an indicator of possible inflammation of the throat (larynx and/or trachea) or bronchi; lung cancer; other bleeding erosions, ulcers, or tumors of the lower airway.
  - Pink sputum – it indicates sputum evenly mixed with blood from alveoli and/or small peripheral bronchi as is seen in potential pulmonary edema.
  - Massive blood – an indicator of possible cavitary tuberculosis or tumor such as lung cancer, or lung abscess; bronchiectasis; lung infarction; pulmonary embolism.
  - Red, jelly-like sputum - an indicator of possible pneumonia caused by Klebsiella.
- Green or greenish colored - indicative of potential longstanding respiratory infection (green from degenerative changes in cell debris) as in pneumonia, ruptured lung abscess, chronic infectious bronchitis, and infected bronchiectasis or cystic fibrosis.
- Rust colored – usually caused by pneumococcal bacteria (in pneumonia), pulmonary embolism, lung cancer or pulmonary tuberculosis.
- Brownish –potential indicator of chronic bronchitis (greenish/yellowish/brown); chronic pneumonia (whitish-brown); tuberculosis; lung cancer.
- Yellow, yellowish purulent – an indicator of the sample containing pus. "The sputum color of patients with acute cough and no underlying chronic lung disease does not imply therapeutic consequences such as prescription of antibiotics." The color can provide hints as to effective treatment in chronic bronchitis patients:
  - A yellow-greenish (mucopurulent) color suggests that treatment with antibiotics can reduce symptoms. The green color is caused by degenerating neutrophil verdoperoxidase.
- Whitish gray sputum color against a white color background (such as a white sink surface) tends to indicate either a specimen from someone who is dehydrated, and/or from an older person, and/or a specimen with a mixed, modest number of eosinophils and maybe some acute inflammatory neutrophil cells (this last choice tends to suggest chronic allergic bronchitis).
- A white, milky, or opaque (mucoid) appearance means that antibiotics are less likely to be effective in treatment because the likelihood is greater of a viral infection or allergy than of antibiotic-responsive micro-organisms. Thickness may indicate asthma.
- Foamy white – may come from earlier-phase pulmonary edema.
- Frothy pink – may indicate more severe pulmonary edema. Antibiotics may not be necessary at this time.
- Clear – pulmonary embolism (clear to frothy); COPD chronic obstructive pulmonary disease (clear to gray); viral respiratory infection (clear to whitish and sometimes a hint of yellow); asthma (thick and white to yellowish).
