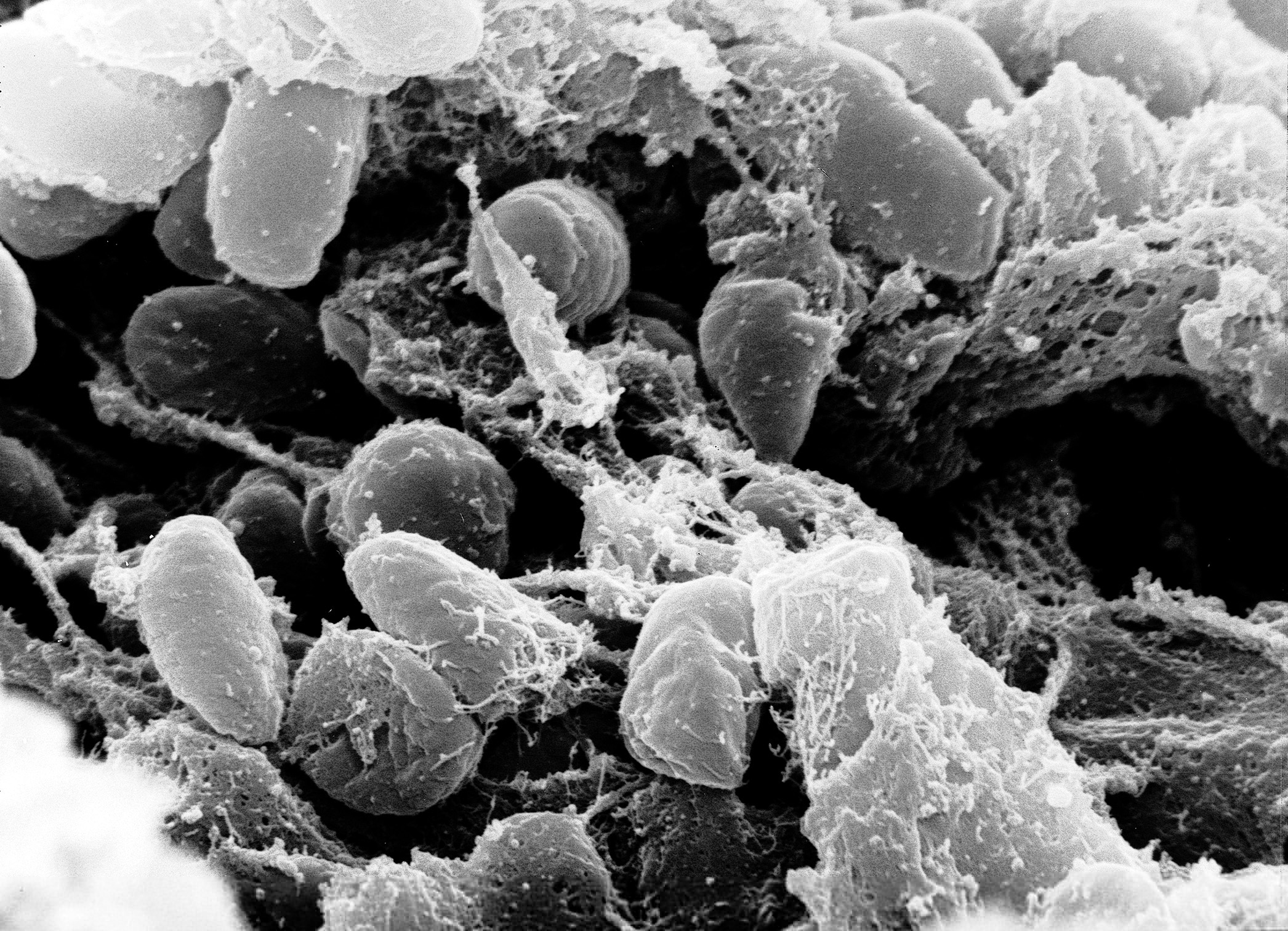
- A scanning electron micrograph depicting a mass of Yersinia pestis bacteria in the foregut of an infected flea

Scientific classification
- Domain: Bacteria
- Kingdom: Pseudomonadati
- Phylum: Pseudomonadota
- Class: Gammaproteobacteria
- Order: Enterobacterales
- Family: Yersiniaceae
- Genus: Yersinia
- Species: Y. pestis

Binomial name
- Yersinia pestis (Lehmann & Neumann, 1896) van Loghem, 1944

Synonyms
- Bacille de la peste Yersin, 1894; Bacterium pestis Lehmann & Neumann, 1896; Pasteurella pestis (Lehmann & Neumann, 1896) The Netherlands, 1920

= Yersinia pestis =

Species of bacteria, cause of plague

Yersinia pestis (Y. pestis; formerly Pasteurella pestis) is a gram-negative, non-motile, coccobacillus bacterium without spores. It is related to pathogens Yersinia enterocolitica and Yersinia pseudotuberculosis, from which it evolved. Yersinia pestis is responsible for the disease plague, which caused the Plague of Justinian and the Black Death, two of the deadliest pandemics in recorded history. Plague takes three main forms: pneumonic, septicemic, and bubonic. Y. pestis is a facultative anaerobic parasitic bacterium that can infect humans primarily via its host, the oriental rat flea (Xenopsylla cheopis), but also through aerosols and airborne droplets for its pneumonic form. As a parasite of its host, the rat flea, which is also a parasite of rats, Y. pestis is a hyperparasite.

Y. pestis was discovered in 1894 by Alexandre Yersin, a Swiss/French physician and bacteriologist from the Pasteur Institute, during an epidemic of the plague in Hong Kong. Yersin was a member of the Pasteur school of thought. Kitasato Shibasaburō, a Japanese bacteriologist who practised Koch's methodology, was also engaged at the time in finding the causative agent of the plague. However, Yersin actually linked plague with a bacillus, initially named Pasteurella pestis; it was renamed Yersinia pestis in 1944.

Between one thousand and two thousand cases of the plague are still reported to the World Health Organization every year. With proper antibiotic treatment, the prognosis for victims is much better than before antibiotics were developed. Cases in Asia increased five- to sixfold during the time of the Vietnam War, possibly due to the disruption of ecosystems and closer proximity between people and animals. The plague is now most commonly found in the Democratic Republic of the Congo, Madagascar, and Peru. The plague also has a detrimental effect on non-human mammals; in the United States, these include the black-tailed prairie dog and the endangered black-footed ferret.

== General features ==
Y. pestis is a non-motile coccobacillus, a facultative anaerobic bacterium with bipolar staining (giving it a safety pin appearance) that produces an antiphagocytic slime layer. Similar to other Yersinia species, it tests negative for urease, lactose fermentation, and indole. The species grows best in temperatures of 28–30 °C (82.4-86 °F), and at a pH of 7.2–7.6, but can live in a large temperature and pH range. It dies very rapidly if exposed to UV light, dried out, or exposed to temperatures higher than 40°C (104°F). There are 11 species in the Yersinia genus, and three of them cause human diseases. The other two are Yersinia pseudotuberculosis and Yersinia enterocolitica; infections by either of these are usually acquired from ingesting contaminated food or water.

== Genome and proteome ==
=== Genome ===
Several complete genome sequences are available for various strains and subspecies of Y. pestis: strain KIM (of biovar Y. p. medievalis), and strain CO92 (of biovar Y. p. orientalis, obtained from a clinical isolate in the United States). In 2006 the genome sequence of a strain of biovar Antiqua was completed. Some strains are non-pathogenic, such as that of strain 91001, whose sequence was published in 2004.

Features of Yersinia pestis genomes
	Antiqua	KIM	CO92	91001
chr. length (bp)	4,702,289	4,600,755	4,653,728	4,595,065
chr. proteins encoded	4,138	4,198	4,012	4,037
chr. pseudogenes	?	54	149	141
chr. tRNAs	68	73	70	72
Biovar	Antiqua	Medievalis	Orientalis	Microtus
Origin	R Congo, 1965	Iran, 1961	USA, 1992	Brandt's vole

=== Plasmids ===
Like Y. pseudotuberculosis and Y. enterocolitica, Y. pestis is host to the plasmid pCD1. It also hosts two other plasmids, pPCP1 (also called pPla or pPst) and pMT1 (also called pFra), that are not carried by the other Yersinia species. pFra codes for a phospholipase D that is important for the ability of Y. pestis to be transmitted by fleas. pPla codes for a protease, Pla, that activates plasmin in human hosts and is a very important virulence factor for pneumonic plague. Together, these plasmids and a pathogenicity island called HPI encode several proteins that cause the pathogenesis for which Y. pestis is famous. Among other things, these virulence factors are required for bacterial adhesion and injection of proteins into the host cell, invasion of bacteria in the host cell (via a type-III secretion system), and acquisition and binding of iron harvested from red blood cells (by siderophores).

The avirluent (to humans) strain 91001 contains a previously unknown plasmid pCRY carrying a cryptic type IV secretory system.

==== Taxonomy ====
Y. pestis is thought to be descended from Y. pseudotuberculosis. DNA–DNA hybridization have found that the two are 83% similar, which is high enough to be considered the same species. In 1981 it was proposed that Y. pestis be reclassified as a subspecies of Y. pseudotuberculosis, but the Judicial Commission of the International Committee on Systematic Bacteriology declined to do this because the course of Y. pestis disease is so different than that of Y. pseudotuberculosis, which usually causes a mild diarrhea, that reclassification would generate confusion.

=== Proteome ===
A comprehensive and comparative proteomics analysis of Y. pestis strain KIM was performed in 2006. The analysis focused on growth under four different sets of conditions that were designed to model flea and mammal hosts.

=== Small noncoding RNA ===
Numerous bacterial small noncoding RNAs have been identified to play regulatory functions. Some can regulate the virulence genes. Some 63 novel putative sRNAs were identified through deep sequencing of the Y. pestis sRNA-ome. Among them was Yersinia-specific (also present in Y. pseudotuberculosis and Y. enterocolitica) Ysr141 (Yersinia small RNA 141). Ysr141 sRNA was shown to regulate the synthesis of the type III secretion system (T3SS) effector protein YopJ. The Yop-Ysc T3SS is a critical component of virulence for Yersinia species. Many novel sRNAs were identified from Y. pestis grown in vitro and in the infected lungs of mice suggesting they play role in bacterial physiology or pathogenesis. Among them, sR035 is predicted to pair with the SD region and transcription initiation site of a thermo-sensitive regulator ymoA, and sR084 is predicted to pair with fur, ferric uptake regulator.

== Pathogenesis and immunity ==
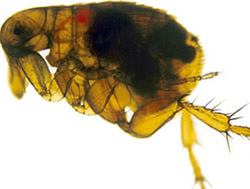
Oriental rat flea (Xenopsylla cheopis) infected with the Y. pestis bacterium, which appears as a dark mass in the gut: The foregut (proventriculus) of this flea is blocked by a Y. pestis biofilm; when the flea attempts to feed on an uninfected host, Y. pestis is regurgitated into the wound, causing infection.

In the urban and sylvatic (forest) cycles of Y. pestis, most of the spreading occurs between rodents and fleas. In the sylvatic cycle, the rodent is wild, but in the urban cycle, the rodent is primarily the brown rat (Rattus norvegicus). In addition, Y. pestis can spread from the urban environment and back. Transmission to humans is usually through the bite of infected fleas. If the disease has progressed to the pneumonic form, humans can spread the bacterium to others through airborne respiratory droplets; others who catch plague this way will mostly contract the pneumonic form themselves.

=== Mammals as hosts ===
Over 200 species of rodents are reservoirs for Y. pestis, with the common reservoirs varying geographically. In the steppes, the natural reservoir is believed to be principally the marmot. In the western United States, several species of rodents are thought to maintain Y. pestis. In North America the common reservoirs are ground and rock squirrels, chipmunks, and prairie dogs; in Asia the common reservoirs are susliks and gerbils; in Africa the common reservoirs are gerbils and Mastomys natalensis; and in South America the short-tailed field mouse is a reservoir of note. Several species of rodents are known to have a variable resistance, which could lead to an asymptomatic carrier status. Evidence indicates fleas from other mammals have a role in human plague outbreaks.

The lack of knowledge of the dynamics of plague in mammal species is also true among susceptible rodents such as the black-tailed prairie dog (Cynomys ludovicianus), in which plague can cause colony collapse, resulting in a massive effect on prairie food webs. However, the transmission dynamics within prairie dogs do not follow the dynamics of blocked fleas; carcasses, unblocked fleas, or another vector could possibly be important, instead.

The CO92 strain was isolated from a patient who died from pneumonia and who contracted the infection from an infected cat.

In other regions of the world, the reservoir of the infection is not clearly identified, which complicates prevention and early-warning programs. One such example was seen in a 2003 outbreak in Algeria.

=== Fleas as vector ===
The transmission of Y. pestis by fleas is well characterized, with over 125 species of flea capable of transmitting Y. pestis. Initial acquisition of Y. pestis by the vector occurs during feeding on an infected animal. Several proteins then contribute to the maintenance of the bacteria in the flea digestive tract, among them the hemin storage system and Yersinia murine toxin (Ymt). Although Ymt is highly toxic to rodents and was once thought to be produced to ensure reinfection of new hosts, it is essential for flea colonization and for the survival of Y. pestis in fleas.

The hemin storage system plays an important role in the transmission of Y. pestis back to a mammalian host. While in the insect vector, proteins encoded by hemin storage system genetic loci induce biofilm formation in the proventriculus, a valve connecting the midgut to the esophagus. The presence of this biofilm seems likely to be required for stable infection of the flea. Aggregation in the biofilm inhibits feeding, as a mass of clotted blood and bacteria forms (referred to as "Bacot's block" after entomologist A.W. Bacot, the first to describe this phenomenon). Transmission of Y. pestis occurs during the futile attempts of the flea to feed. Ingested blood is pumped into the esophagus, where it dislodges bacteria lodged in the proventriculus, which is regurgitated back into the host circulatory system.

=== In humans and other susceptible hosts ===
Pathogenesis due to Y. pestis infection of mammalian hosts is due to several factors, including the ability of these bacteria to suppress and avoid normal immune system responses such as phagocytosis and antibody production. Flea bites allow for the bacteria to pass the skin barrier. Y. pestis expresses a plasmin activator that is an important virulence factor for pneumonic plague and that might degrade blood clots to facilitate systemic invasion. Many of the bacteria's virulence factors are antiphagocytic. Two important antiphagocytic antigens, named F1 (fraction 1) and V or LcrV, are both important for virulence. These antigens are produced by the bacterium at normal human body temperature. Furthermore, Y. pestis survives and produces F1 and V antigens while it is residing within white blood cells such as monocytes, but not in neutrophils. Natural or induced immunity is achieved by the production of specific opsonic antibodies against F1 and V antigens; antibodies against F1 and V induce phagocytosis by neutrophils.

In addition, the type-III secretion system (T3SS) allows Y. pestis to inject proteins into macrophages and other immune cells. These T3SS-injected proteins, called Yersinia outer proteins (Yops), include Yop B/D, which form pores in the host cell membrane and have been linked to cytolysis. The YopO, YopH, YopM, YopT, YopJ, and YopE are injected into the cytoplasm of host cells by T3SS into the pore created in part by YopB and YopD. The injected Yops limit phagocytosis and cell signaling pathways important in the innate immune system, as discussed below. In addition, some Y. pestis strains are capable of interfering with immune signaling (e.g., by preventing the release of some cytokines).

Y. pestis proliferates inside lymph nodes, where it can avoid destruction by cells of the immune system such as macrophages. The ability of Y. pestis to inhibit phagocytosis allows it to grow in lymph nodes and cause lymphadenopathy. YopH is a protein tyrosine phosphatase that contributes to the ability of Y. pestis to evade immune system cells. In macrophages, YopH has been shown to dephosphorylate p130Cas, Fyb (FYN binding protein) SKAP-HOM and Pyk, a tyrosine kinase homologous to FAK. YopH also binds the p85 subunit of phosphoinositide 3-kinase, the Gab1, the Gab2 adapter proteins, and the Vav guanine nucleotide exchange factor.

YopE functions as a GTPase-activating protein for members of the Rho family of GTPases such as RAC1. YopT is a cysteine protease that inhibits RhoA by removing the isoprenyl group, which is important for localizing the protein to the cell membrane. YopE and YopT have been proposed to function to limit YopB/D-induced cytolysis. This might limit the function of YopB/D to create the pores used for Yop insertion into host cells and prevent YopB/D-induced rupture of host cells and release of cell contents that would attract and stimulate immune system responses.

YopJ is an acetyltransferase that binds to a conserved α-helix of MAPK kinases. YopJ acetylates MAPK kinases at serines and threonines that are normally phosphorylated during activation of the MAP kinase cascade. YopJ is activated in eukaryotic cells by interaction with target cell phytic acid (IP6). This disruption of host cell protein kinase activity causes apoptosis of macrophages, and this is proposed to be important for the establishment of infection and for evasion of the host immune response. YopO is a protein kinase also known as Yersinia protein kinase A (YpkA). YopO is a potent inducer of human macrophage apoptosis.

It has also been suggested that a bacteriophage – Ypφ – may have been responsible for increasing the virulence of this organism.

Depending on which form of the plague infects the individual, the plague develops a different illness; however, the plague overall affects the host cell's ability to communicate with the immune system, hindering the body's ability to bring phagocytic cells to the area of infection.

Y. pestis is a versatile killer. In addition to rodents and humans, it is known to have killed camels, chickens, and pigs. Domestic dogs and cats are susceptible to plague, as well, but cats are more likely to develop illness when infected. In either case, the symptoms are similar to those experienced by humans and can be deadly to the animal. People can be exposed by coming into contact with an infected animal (dead or alive), or inhaling infectious droplets that a sick dog or cat has coughed into the air.

=== Immunity ===
A formalin-inactivated vaccine was available in the United States in 1993 for adults at high risk of contracting the plague until removal from the market by the Food and Drug Administration. It was of limited effectiveness and could cause severe inflammation. Experiments with genetic engineering of a vaccine based on F1 and V antigens are underway and show promise. However, bacteria lacking antigen F1 are still virulent, and the V antigens are sufficiently variable such that vaccines composed of these antigens may not be fully protective. The United States Army Medical Research Institute of Infectious Diseases has found that an experimental F1/V antigen-based vaccine protects crab-eating macaques but fails to protect African green monkey species. A systematic review by the Cochrane Collaboration found no studies of sufficient quality to make any statement on the efficacy of the vaccine.

== Isolation and identification ==
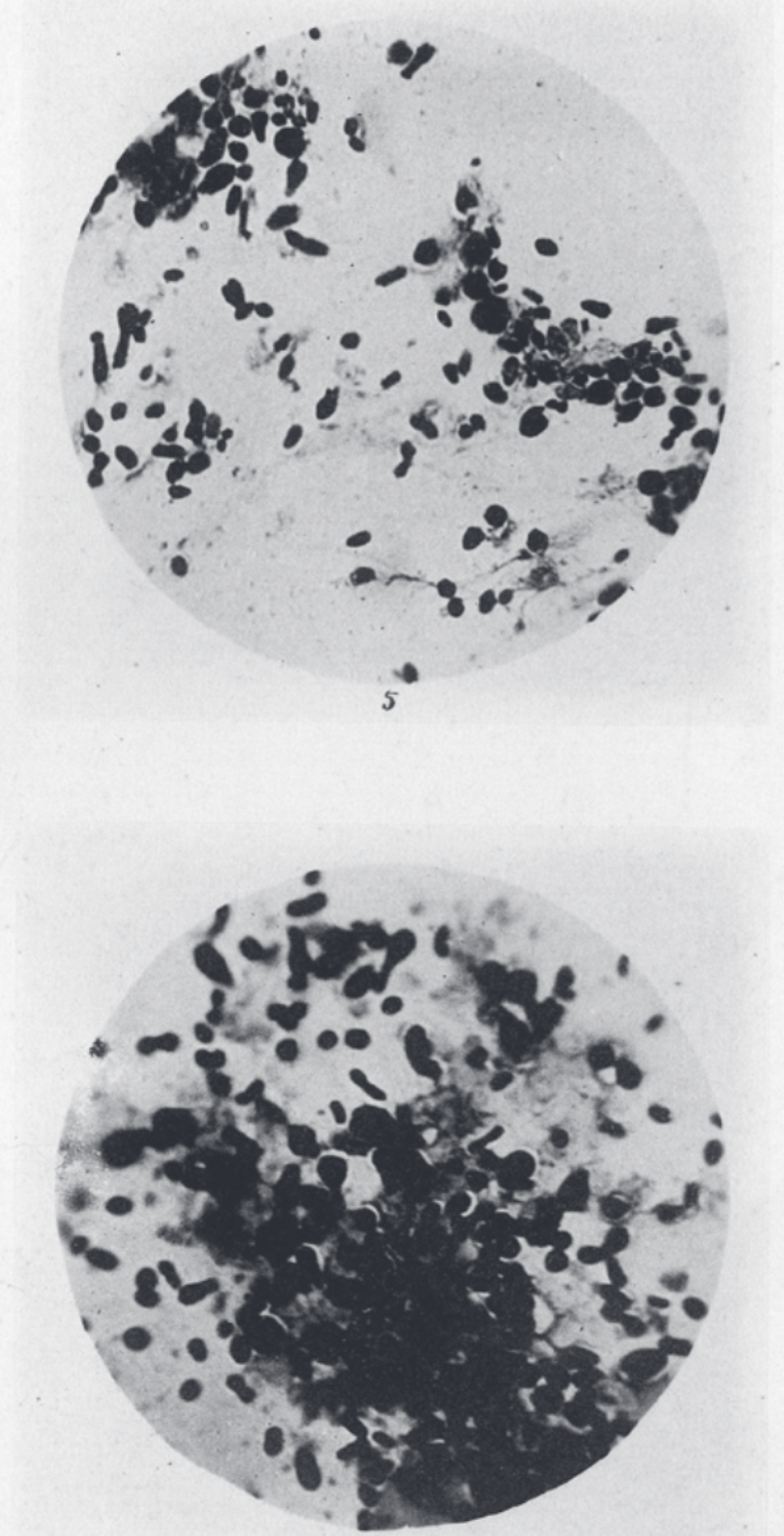
Y. pestis isolated by Ricardo Jorge during the 1899 Porto plague outbreak

In 1894, two bacteriologists, Alexandre Yersin of Switzerland and Kitasato Shibasaburō of Japan, independently isolated in Hong Kong the bacterium responsible for the 1894 Hong Kong plague. Though both investigators reported their findings, a series of confusing and contradictory statements by Kitasato eventually led to the acceptance of Yersin as the primary discoverer of the organism. Yersin named it Pasteurella pestis in honor of the Pasteur Institute, where he worked. In 1967, it was moved to a new genus and renamed Yersinia pestis in his honor. Yersin also noted that rats were affected by plague not only during plague epidemics, but also often preceding such epidemics in humans and that plague was regarded by many locals as a disease of rats; officials in China, India and Australia asserted that when large numbers of rats were found dead, plague outbreaks soon followed.

In 1898, French scientist Paul-Louis Simond (who had also come to China to battle the Third Pandemic) discovered the rat flea vector that drives the disease. He had noted that persons who became ill did not have to be in close contact with each other to acquire the disease. In Yunnan, China, inhabitants would flee from their homes as soon as they saw dead rats, and on the island of Formosa (Taiwan), residents considered the handling of dead rats to be a high-risk activity for developing plague. These observations led him to suspect that the flea might be an intermediary factor in the transmission of plague, since people acquired plague only if they were in contact with rats that had died less than 24 hours before. In a now classic experiment, Simond demonstrated how a healthy rat died of the plague after infected fleas had jumped onto it from a rat that had recently died of the plague. The outbreak spread to Chinatown, San Francisco, from 1900 to 1904 and then to Oakland and the East Bay from 1907 to 1909. It has been present in the rodents of western North America ever since, as fear of the consequences of the outbreak on trade caused authorities to hide the dead of the Chinatown residents long enough for the disease to be passed to widespread species of native rodents in outlying areas.

Three main biovars are recognised: Y. p. antiqua, which caused a plague pandemic in the sixth century; Y. p. medievalis, which caused the Black Death and subsequent epidemics during the second pandemic wave; and Y. p. orientalis, which is responsible for current plague outbreaks. There are also less important biovars such as microtus which is virulent to rodents but not humans. Additional lineages such as LBNA- and LBNA+ are known from ancient DNA.

== 21st century ==
On 15 January 2018, researchers at the University of Oslo and the University of Ferrara suggested that, as far as the second pandemics from the Middle Ages to the early-modern period are concerned, humans and their parasites (most likely fleas and lice at the time) were the biggest carriers of the plague. Though rodents and their fleas do appear to be an essential component in the third pandemics of the modern day.

=== Ancient DNA evidence ===
In 2010, researchers in Germany definitively established, using PCR evidence from samples obtained from Black Death victims, that Y. pestis was the cause of the medieval Black Death.

In 2011, the first genome of Y. pestis isolated from Black Death victims was published, and concluded that this medieval strain was ancestral to most modern forms of Y. pestis.

In 2015, Cell published results from a study of ancient graves. Plasmids of Y. pestis were detected in archaeological samples of the teeth of seven Bronze Age individuals, in the Afanasievo culture in Siberia, the Corded Ware culture in Estonia, the Sintashta culture in Russia, the Unetice culture in Poland, and the Andronovo culture in Siberia. In 2018, the emergence and spread of the pathogen during the Neolithic decline (as far back as 6,000 years ago) was published. A site in Sweden was the source of the DNA evidence and trade networks were proposed as the likely avenue of spread rather than migrations of populations. There is evidence that suggests Y. pestis may have originated in Europe in the Cucuteni–Trypillia culture, not in Asia as is more commonly believed.

DNA evidence published in 2015 indicates Y. pestis infected humans 5,000 years ago in Bronze Age Eurasia, but genetic changes that made it highly virulent did not occur until about 4,000 years ago. The highly virulent version capable of transmission by fleas through rodents, humans, and other mammals was found in two individuals associated with the Srubnaya culture from the Samara region in Russia from around 3,800 years ago and an Iron Age individual from Kapan, Armenia, from around 2,900 years ago. This indicates that at least two lineages of Y. pestis were circulating during the Bronze Age in Eurasia. The Y. pestis bacterium has a relatively large number of nonfunctioning genes and three "ungainly" plasmids, suggesting an origin less than 20,000 years ago. One such strain has been identified from about 4000 BP, the "LNBA lineage" (Late Neolithic and Bronze Age lineage) in western Britain, indicating that this highly transmissible form spread from Eurasia to the far north-western edges of Europe.

In 2016, the Y. pestis bacterium was identified from DNA in teeth found at a Crossrail building site in London. The human remains were found to be victims of the Great Plague of London, which lasted from 1665 to 1666.

In 2021, researchers found a 5,000-year-old victim of Y. pestis, the world's oldest-known, in hunter-gatherer remains in the modern Latvian and Estonian border area.

Between 5,300 and 4,900 YBP, the population of Neolithic farmers in northern Europe underwent a marked decline. It had not been determined whether this was the result of agricultural recession or from Y. pestis infection within the population. A 2024 study of Neolithic graves in Denmark and western Sweden concluded that plague was sufficiently widespread to be the cause of the decline, and that there were three outbreaks in Northern Europe between 5,200 years ago and 4,900 years ago, with the final outbreak caused by a strain of Yersinia pestis with reshuffled genes. However, another recent study, contests this notion. Based on 133 individuals from gallery graves of the Wartberg Culture, a research team from Kiel University (Collaborative Research Centre 1266) found Yersinia pestis in two individuals only. This indicates that there was no large-scale disease outbreak in this cultural context. Moreover, they found that a dog was infected.

In August 2025, researchers published findings recovering an Late Neolithic and Bronze Age (LNBA) lineage Y. pestis genome from the tooth of a domesticated sheep from the Bronze Age (about 4,000 years ago) in modern-day Russia, confirming sheep as a host in the ancient past and providing evidence that livestock could have played a role in the transmission of the pathogen towards humans.

=== Events ===
Between 1970 and 2023, 502 cases were reported in the United States, with an average of 7 cases per year. Cases have been found predominantly in New Mexico, Arizona, Colorado, California, Oregon, and Nevada.

In 2008, plague was commonly found in sub-Saharan Africa and Madagascar, areas that accounted for over 95% of the reported cases.

In September 2009, the death of Malcolm Casadaban, a molecular genetics professor at the University of Chicago, was linked to his work on a weakened laboratory strain of Y. pestis. Hemochromatosis was hypothesised to be a predisposing factor in Casadaban's death from this attenuated strain used for research.

On 3 November 2019, two cases of pneumonic plague were diagnosed at a hospital in Beijing's Chaoyang district, prompting fears of an outbreak. The patient was a middle-aged man with fever who had complained of difficulty breathing for some ten days, accompanied by his wife, with similar symptoms. Police quarantined the emergency room at the hospital, and controls were placed on Chinese news aggregators. On 18 November, a third case was reported, in a 55-year-old man from Xilingol League, one of the twelve Mongolian autonomous regions in Northern China. The patient received treatment, and 28 symptomless contacts were placed in quarantine.

In July 2020, officials increased precautions after a case of bubonic plague was confirmed in Bayannur, a city in China's Inner Mongolia autonomous region. The patient was quarantined and treated. According to China's Global Times, a second suspected case was also investigated, and a level 3 alert was issued, in effect until the end of the year. It forbade hunting and eating of animals that could carry plague and called on the public to report suspected cases.

On September 25, 2026, 28-year-old laboratory assistant Darya Shipilova of the Irkutsk Anti-Plague Research Institute accidentally broke a test tube containing Y. pestis. Shipilova's condition worsened on September 27; she was admitted to the Shelekhov district hospital on either September 29 or October 1, and she died inside the hospital's intensive care unit on October 2.
