= Evergreen Cemetery (Los Angeles) =

Cemetery in Boyle Heights, California

Evergreen Memorial Park & Crematory
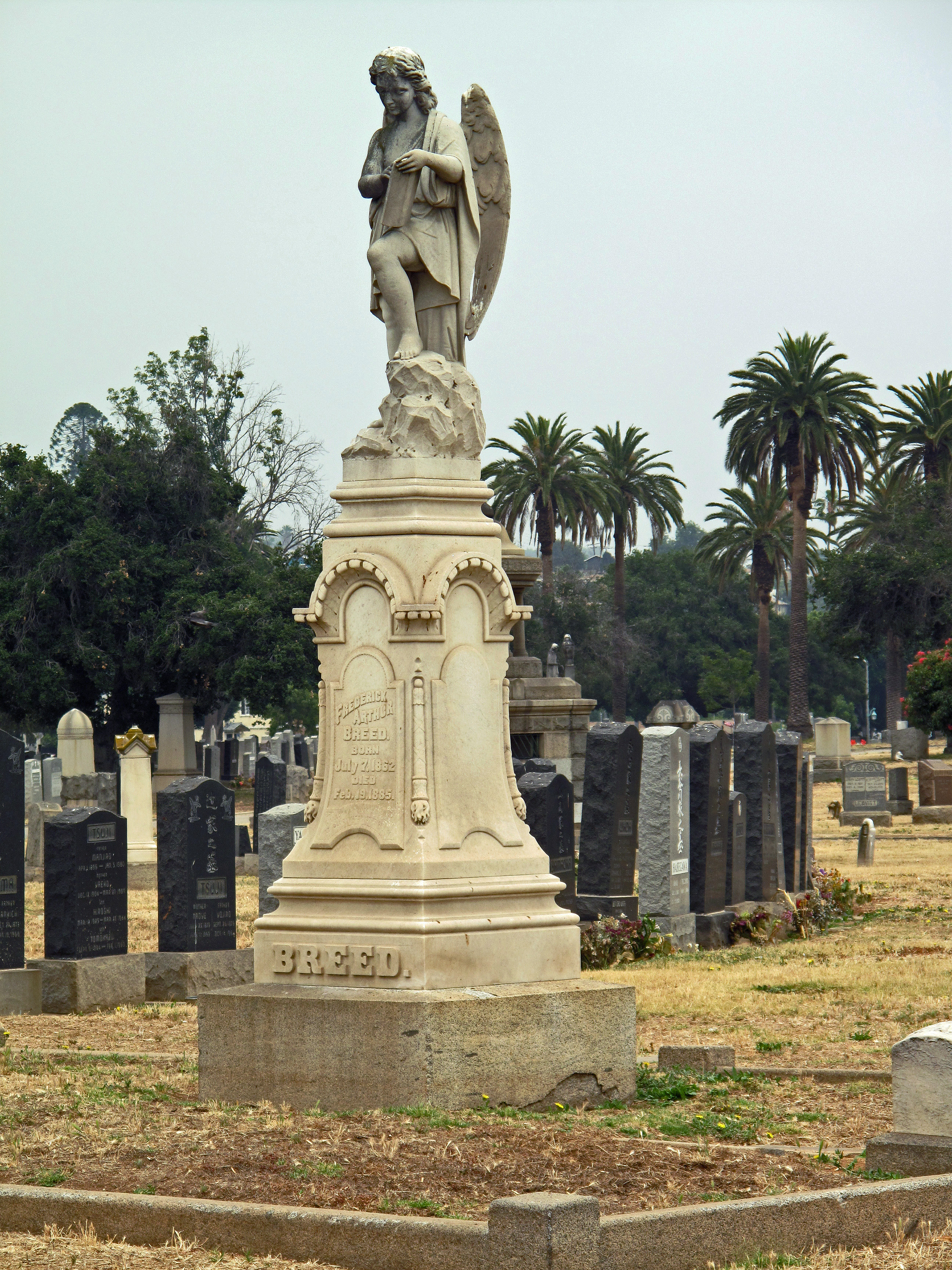
- Breed family monument and Japanese tombstones
- Interactive map of Evergreen Memorial Park & Crematory

Details
- Established: 1877
- Location: 204 N. Evergreen Avenue; Boyle Heights, Los Angeles, California
- Coordinates: 34.0402899°N 118.1978499°W
- Type: Private
- Size: 67 acres (27 ha)
- No. of graves: >300,000
- Find a Grave: Evergreen Memorial Park & Crematory
- The Political Graveyard: Evergreen Memorial Park & Crematory

Evergreen Memorial Park & Crematory is a cemetery in the East Side neighborhood of Boyle Heights, Los Angeles, California.

Evergreen has several prominent individuals of historical Southern California on its grounds. Many pioneers are interred here, names such as Bixby, Coulter, Hollenbeck, Lankershim, Van Nuys, and Workman. There are politicians, notably former Mayors of Los Angeles. The Garden of the Pines section of the cemetery is a memorial to Japanese Issei pioneers.

== History ==
Established on August 23, 1877, Evergreen is the oldest, and one of the largest, extant cemeteries in the city with over 300,000 interments. The section near 1st and Lorena streets was at one time a potter's field.

Evergreen is notable for never having banned African Americans from being buried at the cemetery. It has sections for Armenians, Japanese, and early white settlers, and a large section of Mexican graves.

=== Burials ===
Although Evergreen had established burial sites for different ethnicities, they were still segregated from one another. First-generation Japanese, called Issei, had established a burial site on the grounds. In 1949, a memorial for the 442nd Regimental Combat Team was incorporated and remembered for the Japanese-American soldiers who had fallen during World War II. Every year during the Obon festival, families gather to keep up their relatives' tombstones and to visit the spirits.

Biddy Mason, nurse and philanthropist, was one of the well known figures to be buried at the cemetery, in 1891. There is a section called the “Showmen’s Rest” in which 400 carnival workers and circus performers are buried by a memorial that is decorated with a lion. It was established by the Pacific Coast Showmen's Association in 1922. One presumed serial killer, Bertha Bielstein, at one time lay in Evergreen Cemetery; however she was buried under another name, Olga Miller. Bielstein came from an upper-middle-class family in Pittsburgh, Pennsylvania. She was suspected of killing her parents in their home and moving to Los Angeles after escaping from a mental institution. Later her identity was confirmed and her body was relocated back east.

== Potter's field ==
In return for a zoning variance to permit the cemetery, the founders of Evergreen gave the City of Los Angeles a 9-acre (36,000 m^{2}) parcel of the proposed cemetery in 1877 for use as an indigent graveyard, often referred as a "potter's field." Ownership of the indigent cemetery passed from the City to the County of Los Angeles in 1917. At the time, it was clear the potter's field would have burial space for only a few more years. By 1924, burial space in the potter's field was exhausted and the county built a crematorium at the site, on the corner of Lorena and 1st streets, and began to cremate its indigent deceased.

Evergreen Cemetery purchased most of the 9-acre (36,000 m^{2}) potter's field from the county in 1964. It then prepared the newly recovered parcel for burials by covering it with 8 feet (2.4 m) of compacted soil. Only the crematorium was retained by the county. In 2007, the cremated remains of over 1700 unclaimed bodies were buried in the cemetery.

=== Potter's field and Chinese Shrine ===
Chinese Shrine at Evergreen Cemetery

Los Angeles Historic-Cultural Monument
- Official name: Nineteenth Century Los Angeles Chinese Cemetery Shrine
- Designated: August 31, 1990
- Reference no.: 486

Until the Civil Rights era, racism barred the Chinese from burying their dead in most cemeteries, including Evergreen. The only place that allowed burial of Chinese persons was the city's potter's field. Unlike white indigents, who were buried at no charge, the Chinese had to pay US$10 (HK$78) to be interred.

The Chinese community was allowed to utilize a corner of the potter's field and soon after, in September 1888, erected a shrine. Evergreen left the shrine in place when it purchased the potter's field from the county in 1964 and let it fall into disrepair over the years. The shrine and the land under it were eventually purchased by the Chinese Historical Society of Southern California in 1992 and restored soon after. It is now a registered historic monument.

By the time the county took ownership of the potter's field in 1917, it was clear it was running out of space, so the Chinese community responded by purchasing land and in 1922 opening the Chinese Cemetery. The county saw this as an opportunity to extend the useful life of the potter's field. Norman Martin, Superintendent for the County Department of Charities, wrote to Chan Kai Sing, Secretary of the Chinese Chamber of Commerce. In a letter, dated June 19, 1923, he wrote:

"Recently your people established a new Chinese cemetery on East 1st Street, and it would be highly desirable if the bodies buried in the county cemetery could be transferred to your new location."

Despite acknowledging there were 902 Chinese buried at the site, and that each grave had cost the Chinese US$10, Martin wanted the remains moved to the new cemetery and offered $2 per body as compensation, "The idea being that you would move all of the bodies as fast as practicable."

During the summer of 2005, the Los Angeles County Metropolitan Transportation Authority Metro construction workers widening First Street for the Metro L Line light rail extension uncovered the skeletal remains of 174 people buried near the south side of the Los Angeles County Crematorium, adjacent to Evergreen Cemetery. Archaeologists working for the agency determined that the excavation site was likely the Chinese section of the potter's field. The majority of the remains were Asian males found along with rice bowls, jade bracelets, Chinese burial bricks, Asian coins and opium pipes. The remains were buried inside Evergreen Cemetery, near the Chinese Shrine, and a memorial was dedicated on March 7, 2010.

== Memorial Day ==
Since 1897, Evergreen has held festivities every Memorial Day. Veterans, activist groups and families enter the cemetery grounds. Military organizations are stationed at different places as the Veterans Drum Corps lead the way from the streets, and Medal of Honor wreaths are distributed to the gravesites. Sometimes guest speakers are invited to make speeches.

== Jogging track ==
With only a few open areas in Boyle Heights, the Evergreen Jogging Path Coalition worked with city officials to bring together a fitness area to improve local health. In 2003, a 1.4 mile jogging track was completed, encircling the cemetery. The track has exercise stations, shade, and benches so people from around the metro area can exercise regularly. as part of the Eastside Access Project which assists in building easier paths to the metro stations and accessible tracks for fitness. The path was dedicated in the memory of local activist, Lloyd Monserratt.

In 2016 it received new additions and updated facilities.

== Notable interments ==
=== A ===
- Eddie Anderson (1905–1977), comedic actor, played Rochester, Jack Benny's valet

=== B ===
- James Banning (1900–1933), pioneering African American aviator
- Florence Barker (1891–1913), stage and silent film actress
- Charlotta Bass (1874–1969), educator, publisher and civil rights activist
- Louise Beavers (1902–1962), actress
- Matthew "Stymie" Beard (1925–1981), actor
- Jesse Belvin (1932–1960), singer and songwriter
- Jotham Bixby (1831–1917), father of Long Beach
- Frank Braxton (1929–1969), pioneering African-American animator and director
- Kate Brousseau (1862–1938), chair of the Psychology Department at Mills College
- Everett Brown (1902–1953), actor

=== C ===
- Donaldina Cameron (1869–1968), social reformer
- Charles A. Canfield (1848–1913), pioneer oilman in California and Mexico.
- Alonzo "Lonnie" Clayton (1876–1917), youngest jockey to ever win the Kentucky Derby.

=== D ===
- Tisdale Justin Dow (1888–1940), Silent Film Actor.
- Pearlretta DuPuy (1871–1939), musician.

=== F ===
- Mary Foy (1862–1962), first female head librarian of the Los Angeles Public Library

=== G ===
- Katherine Grant (1904–1937), silent film actress
- John Strother Griffin (1816–1898), pioneer physician and the founder of East Los Angeles
- LtC John Franklin "Frank" Godfrey (1839–1885), Civil War veteran, Indian Wars veteran, Los Angeles city attorney in 1876.

=== H ===
- Joe Hayashi (1920–1945), Medal of Honor recipient
- Henry T. Hazard (1844–1921), 28th Mayor of Los Angeles
- John Edward Hollenbeck (1829–1885), businessman and investor who was involved in the 19th century development of Los Angeles and of Nicaragua

=== J ===
- Charles Price Jones (1865–1949), minister, composer and founder of the Church of Christ (Holiness)

=== L ===
- Isaac Lankershim (1818–1882), German-born American landowner and pioneer in California
- Gilbert W. Lindsay (1900–1990), Los Angeles City Councilman

=== M ===
- Biz Mackey (1897–1965), Baseball Hall of Famer of the Negro leagues
- Bridget "Biddy" Mason (1818–1891), former slave, nurse, real estate entrepreneur
- Tōyō Miyatake (1896–1979), photographer and documenter of the Japanese American internment
- Sadao Munemori (1922–1945), Medal of Honor recipient
- Kiyoshi K. Muranaga (1922–1944), Medal of Honor recipient

=== N ===
- Wataru Nakamura (1921–1951), Korean War Medal of Honor recipient
- Bobby Nunn (1925–1986), singer
- Jimmie Noone (1895–1944), clarinetist

=== O ===
- Frances O'Connor (1914–1982), Performer

=== P ===
- Samuel Marshall Perry (1836–1898), Los Angeles City councilman and County supervisor
- William Hayes Perry (1832–1906), lumber baron, first president of LADWP

=== R ===
- Frederick Madison Roberts (1879–1952), California Assemblyman
- Earl Rogers (1869–1922), attorney
- George Ralphs (1850–1914) businessman

=== S ===
- Nyogen Senzaki (1876–1958), Zen monk and teacher
- William J. Seymour (1870–1922), religious leader
- Edward F. Spence (1832–1892), 25th Mayor of Los Angeles
- Johnny St. Cyr (1890–1966), musician
- Otto Albert Stassforth (1863–1910), banker, real estate developer,
- Dora A. Stearns (1883–1942), ran for State Senator in 1923

=== T ===
- Ted T. Tanouye (1919–1944), Medal of Honor recipient
- Cameron E. Thom (1825–1915), 24th Mayor of Los Angeles, co-founder of Glendale, California
- James R. Toberman (1836–1911), 19th and 23rd Mayor of Los Angeles
- Misak Torlakian (1892–1968), assassin of Behbud Khan Javanshir
- Benjamin Cummings Truman (1835–1916), writer
- Hsi Tseng Tsiang (1899–1971), writer of novels, poetry, and plays, self-trained actor

=== V ===
- Isaac Newton Van Nuys (1836–1912), banker, real estate developer, founder of Van Nuys
- Gary Vinson (1936–1984), actor

=== W ===
- Phillip Walker (1937–2010), electric blues guitarist
- Kenny Washington (1918–1971), professional American football player
- Guilford Wiley Wells (1840–1909), U.S. Congressman
- Joseph Pomeroy Widney (1841–1938), 2nd president of USC, co-founder of Church of the Nazarene
- Boyle Workman (1868–1942), politician and businessman, son of William H. Workman
- William H. Workman (1839–1918), 26th Mayor of Los Angeles

=== Z ===
- Hugo Zacchini (1898–1975) daredevil, "human cannonball", artist
- Otto J. Zahn (1871–1965), Los Angeles City Council member

== In popular culture ==
- In Heaven Can Wait, Joe Pendleton's ashes are scattered in this cemetery following a memorial service.
- Rod Lane is buried here after Freddy Krueger murders him in his prison cell and makes it look like a suicide in A Nightmare on Elm Street.
- In American Me, Santana and JD are seen walking into the Stassforth Mausoleum.
- In I Spit on Your Grave: Deja Vu, Jennifer Hills is decapitated at the chapel front door
- The cemetery and many graves of some of its famous internments such as Jotham Bixby can be seen at the opening scenes of the 1983 horror film Mausoleum.
