= 1924 Los Angeles pneumonic plague outbreak =

Disease outbreak in Los Angeles, California

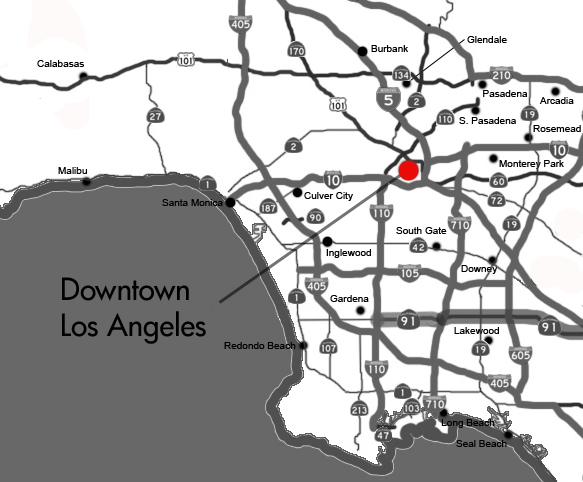
- Downtown area of Los Angeles, California
- Disease: Pneumonic plague
- Source: Rats
- Location: Los Angeles, California, United States
- Index case: Jesús Lajun
- Date: September 28, 1924 to November 13, 1924
- Suspected cases^{‡}: 37 (clinically diagnosed)
- Deaths: 30
- ^{‡}Suspected cases have not been confirmed by laboratory tests as being due to this strain, although some other strains may have been ruled out.

The 1924 Los Angeles pneumonic plague outbreak was an outbreak of the pneumonic plague in Los Angeles, California that began on September 28, 1924, and was declared fully contained on November 13, 1924. It represented the first time that the plague had emerged in Southern California since plague outbreaks had previously surfaced in San Francisco and Oakland. The suspected reason for this outbreak was a rat epizootic where squirrels that were found to be plague infected were secondarily infected by rats. Due to the evidence of infected squirrels near San Luis Obispo County as late as July 1924 and the migration habits of both squirrels and rats, it is thought that squirrels were the original source of the plague outbreak in Los Angeles.

The outbreak killed 30 people and infected several more. Public health officials credited the lessons learned from the San Francisco outbreak with saving lives, and swiftly implemented preventative measures, including hospitalization of the sick and all their contacts, a neighborhood quarantine, and a large-scale rat eradication program. The epicenter of the plague was in the Macy Street District, primarily home to Mexican immigrants, which was also known as "Little Mexico". Racism against Mexican Americans tainted the reaction to the plague, an issue not made public until the outbreak concluded. This outbreak was the last instance of aerosol transmission of the plague and the last major plague outbreak in the United States.

== Background ==
During the 1920s, thousands of Mexicans crossed the border to work on large plantations that thrived on "cheap, compliant labor". The large plantation owners supported open immigration, because Mexicans were thought of as "docile and backward". However, immigrants faced a backlash from labor unions which supported increased border security and often expressed racists tendencies towards Hispanic immigrants due to the belief that cheap labor on plantations would favor immigrants instead of American workers. In addition, Hispanics also had to face the stereotype of spreading crime and disease, and some worried that they refused to assimilate into white America. As a consequence, Hispanics were often "physically isolated from the white" communities of Los Angeles. At the time, roughly 19% of Los Angeles residents were foreign born, 22,000 of which were Mexican.

At the time, Los Angeles, being the largest city on the West Coast and the fifth-largest in the country, was growing on an economy primarily reliant on its flourishing tourism industry, a "land boom," and a new harbor. An ideal climate allowed its population to explode in the early 20th century: it grew by 80.66% between 1910 and 1920 and by 114.69% between 1920 and 1930.

Mexicans in Los Angeles mostly settled in Eastern Los Angeles and unincorporated territory of Los Angeles County, primarily in two neighborhoods – known by white residents as ghettos – Belvedere and the Macy Street District. In the Macy Street District, named for its southern boundary of Macy Street (now Cesar Chavez Avenue), roughly 3,000 residents were surrounded by the Los Angeles River, polluted by dead carcasses and brick, coal, gas and meatpacking plants. It was a more rural feeling area where chickens and other farm animals ran free. The rat population also thrived on the prevalence of horse and mule yards. Residents were crammed into one-fifth of a square mile, living in cramped residences with high rent despite low-quality living conditions. Residents often had to travel through someone's else's apartment to get to their own room. Despite often illegal living conditions, no investigations into the Macy District's living conditions was ever held, and the only four paved roads into the District were never inspected by the Department of Streets and Sanitation. Many papers rarely bothered to report on the area and when they did it was to describe crime or recount comical tales of citizens chasing chickens around Clara Street.

== Timeline ==
=== September 1924 ===
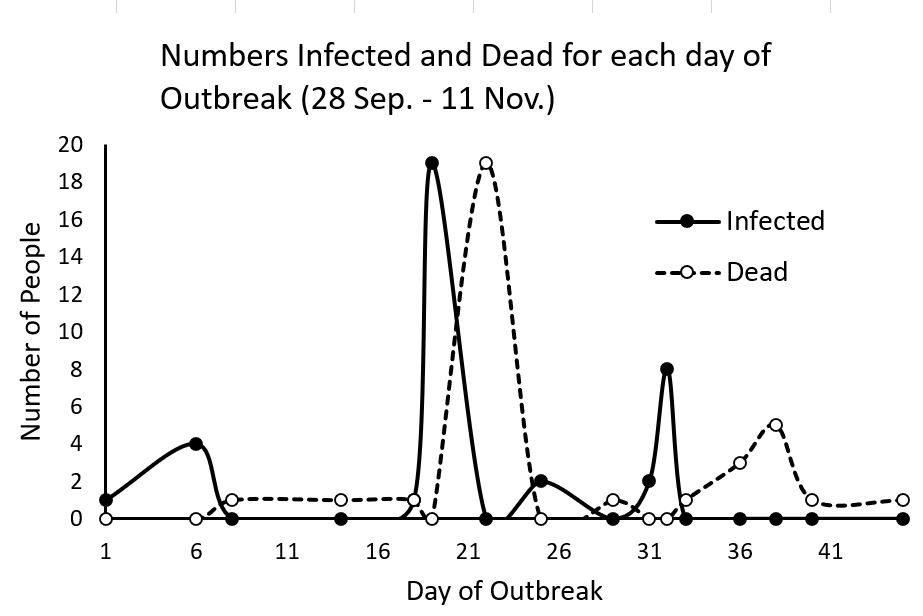
Estimated numbers of people infected and dead for each day out outbreak, from September 11, 1924, to November 1, 1924. The numbers were estimated using reported totals of infected and dead for certain days.

On September 28, 1924, in the Macy Street District (present day Los Angeles Chinatown) of Los Angeles, California, a 51-year-old man named Jesús Lajun fell ill with a fever and a painful lump in his groin. Prior to the onset of symptoms, Lajun had discovered a decaying rat under his house and picked it up to throw into the trash. A physician initially diagnosed Lajun's pneumonic plague as a venereal disease (sexually transmitted infection), due to his enlarged lymph node.

Even after the Los Angeles City Health Officers' eventual confirmation of the disease as the pneumonic plague, the disease was not referred to by its name.

Investigators initially believed that Lajun had contracted the bubonic plague. Left untreated, the bubonic plague can move to the lungs and cause a secondary pneumonic infection, with a mortality rate of 40–60%.

As Lajun's condition worsened, he developed extreme symptoms such as bloody sputum, causing physician to believe it converted into pneumonic form. Because he was the first with identifiable symptoms of the plague, Lajun was designated the index patient.

=== October 1924 ===
In the same week, on October 3, 1924, Jesús Lajun's fifteen-year-old daughter Francisca also fell ill, complaining of fever and shortness of breath. Both Lajun and his daughter also had sore throats and back pain. Dr. Giles Porter, a physician of the Los Angeles City Health Office, was called to the house and diagnosed Francisca with lobar pneumonia, a form of pneumonia weakening the lobe of a lung due to inflammatory exudate between alveoli. Dr. Porter initially diagnosed Lajun's plague as a venereal disease, or sexually transmitted infection, due to his enlarged lymph node. Following the Lajuns' diagnosis, they were treated by Lucina Samarano, a pregnant nurse. Samarano lived at 742 Clara Street (Bing Map), which would become the eventual epicenter of the outbreak.

However, neither of the Lajuns recovered. Francisca died in an ambulance on its way to Los Angeles County General Hospital after her symptoms worsened. An autopsy of Francisca performed by pathologist Webb ruled her cause of death as double pneumonia. Jesús Lajun died on October 11, with his cause of death ruled as bronchopneumonia.

Meanwhile, Lucina Samarano developed similar respiratory symptoms and died days later on October 15. No autopsy was conducted on Samarano however, she had been diagnosed as having acute myocarditis, or inflammation of the heart muscle. Samarano was six months pregnant when she first got sick, and delivered a stillborn baby boy shortly before she died. Her body was returned to her husband Guadalupe Samarano, who later developed infection and died within days.

Between October 15 and 19, Father M. Brualla, a Catholic priest who had administered last rites to the affected people and held the requiem mass for Samarano, developed the same respiratory symptoms and died days later, as did several attendants of Samarano's funeral. Many of the Samaranos' friends and family were unknowingly infected by Guadalupe Samarano, and within a week, the plague killed his entire family of eight.

On October 22, Guadalupe and Jessie Flores, neighbors of the Samaranos, also fell ill with symptoms of the pneumonic plague and were subsequently hospitalized at the General Hospital. On October 24, physicians again misdiagnosed the Flores with severe pneumonia as there was no known connection at the time between the Flores and Samaranos.

On October 26, Guadalupe Flores died and received an autopsy by pathologist Lawrence Parsons, who misruled his cause of death as double pneumonia. No bacterial culture was conducted to correctly identify the cause of his pneumonia as Yersinia pestis, the causative agent of the pneumonic plague. Flores' body was returned to his family on October 27, exposing them to the bacteria. Afterwards, the hospital's morgue staff was quarantined for five days.

On October 28, physician George Stevens reported an unknown, highly contagious disease to the hospital and recommended the construction of a quarantine ward after he and physician Dr. Elmer Anderson both treated patients in unusually critical condition. That same day, brothers Mike and Jose Jiminez also fell ill and vacated 742 Clara Street, the residence of the Samaranos, exposing the rest of the district to the plague.

On October 29, several people who were in close contact with the Samaranos contracted the plague, including Mary Costello, Guadalupe Samarano's nurse; Fred Ortega, who lived at 742 Clara Street; Samarano's mother, Maria; and his brother, Victor. Maria and Victor Samarano were hospitalized under Dr. Bogen's supervision after exhibiting suspected symptoms of avian influenza. Jesus and Maria Valenzuela, cousins of the Samaranos, also fell ill with symptoms of the plague, though they were not traced back to the Samaranos. The Samaranos' children, Alfredo, Gilberto, Raul, and Roberto, along with six others, were hospitalized and diagnosed with meningitis, despite their skin turning black, a pathognomonic symptom of the plague. A physician also requested an ambulance from the hospital for two patients in critical condition and were highly contagious.

On October 30, the Los Angeles County Hospital pathologist George Maner finally identified the pneumonic plague as the disease causing the outbreak and notified the Los Angeles City Health Department and state officials. Maner identified it from a blood serum sample from a patient who died after attending Lucena Samarano's funeral. Interestingly, Maner had never worn gloves during autopsies, but immediately began to once he detected the pathogen. City health officials quarantined an eight-block area encompassing Clara Street, where the funeral had taken place, as well as a six-block area in Belvedere after Jesús Lajun was identified as the index case, but did not announce the causative disease of the outbreak. Thirteen more cases of an unknown disease were admitted, all of whom developed cyanosis and hemoptysis, or bloody sputum, the former of which is indicative of low oxygen saturation of tissues near the skin surface. Three of the patients died the same day, and in response the pneumonic plague was first suggested as the cause of the outbreak. The following morning, the diagnosis of pneumonic plague was confirmed by pathologists after an autopsy reported gram-negative bipolar staining bacilli resembling the plague.

On October 31, the United States Public Health Service and California State Board of Health learned of the diagnosis indirectly from telegrams sent from the assistant superintendent of the hospital. The telegram was sent to federal and state authorities and medical supply dealers to explore where vaccines or serums to the plague could be found. However, the antiserum requested was produced solely by the H.K. Mulford Company laboratories in Philadelphia, a 3,141-mile journey which would require automobile transport to Mineola, New York then a flight by mail plane to Los Angeles with a stopover in San Francisco. With cooperation from the United States Post Office Department and its respective air mail officials, it was prepared within an hour, according to the company. In a promotional literature release by Mulford Laboratories, a producer of the serum, stated that the serum was delivered within 36 hours, would stop the "Swath of Death", and "save the lives of thousands".

The same day, County Health Commissioner J. L. Pomeroy imposed a quarantine around midnight, with 75 police officers and 200 armed World War I veterans deployed to assist quarantine guards in enforcing the quarantine, who often looted from local residents and businesses. The guards ruled vigilantly in the quarantined district and shot stray dogs, cats, chickens, and more in an attempt to eradicate animals that could potentially be plague-infected.

=== November 1924 ===
On November 1, Benjamin Brown, a United States Public Health Service surgeon in Los Angeles, warned the United States Surgeon General Hugh S. Cumming of the outbreak and Yersin's request for an antiserum. Brown's transmission was encoded, referring to "pneumonic plague" as "ekkil", "suspected cases" as "suspects", "deaths" as "begos", and "situation bad" as "ethos":

Eighteen cases ekkil. Three suspects. Ten begos. Ethos. Recommend federal aid

Cumming then alerted Senior Surgeon James Perry, who was then stationed in San Francisco, to confidentially investigate the outbreak, attempting to avoid gratuitous involvement in state and municipal affairs.

10 more fatalities were recorded, and Pomeroy extended the quarantine to encompass the entire Macy Street District, purportedly to ensure that "Mexicans who we feared would scatter" couldn't evade the original quarantine. The border's boundaries were closed to regular vehicle traffic and guards were positioned at every home with suspected cases. Agricultural and railroad workers were exempted from the quarantine. A temporary laboratory was constructed by the Los Angeles City Health Department in the quarantined area to quickly identify new cases. By this time, the cause of the outbreak had been definitively established as the pneumonic plague.

Fatalities spiked yet again on November 2. Among them was Father Bruella, who oversaw the last rites of many of the plague patients in his ward and died from the plague at 9 a.m. By this time, over 400 armed guards were deployed to implement the quarantine. Despite its rapid spread, the outbreak remained largely unknown to the public – information that was released was often falsified or distorted, such as the Los Angeles Times, which attributed the quarantine to pneumonia, as opposed to newspapers on the East Coast which generally covered the outbreak without hesitation.

By November 3, 24 people died over the course of two weeks, (Note: Reported as 21 deaths in newspapers at the time due to the misdiagnoses of the Lajuns and Lucina Samarano.) all but one of whom were Mexicans. All Mexicans who died were required to undergo an autopsy even if it is not suspected that they died of the plague. Los Angeles authorities racially quarantined Mexican homes outside of the Macy Street District as well as majority African American, Chinese, and Japanese neighborhoods. The Macy Street District port mandated the inspection and fumigation of incoming ships while outgoing ships hung a yellow flag, indicating the ship originated in a quarantined zone.

On November 4, 5 more died, bringing the total death toll to 29 (reported as 25 in local newspapers).

On November 5, the plague antiserum requested by the Los Angeles County Hospital finally arrived, though it was only used on three patients, was successfully used on only two patients, Raul Samarano and Mary Costello, and remained largely unused for the rest of the outbreak. However, there were doubts on the effectiveness of the serum against pneumonic plague from reports. There was mention of the use mercurochrome as a therapeutic agent that aided in the subsequent recovery of two plague patients. Before the antiserum was used on Mary Costello, she endured intravenous injections of mercurochrome because it was believed that the compound was a way of sterilizing the body's infected blood and other maladies. By this time, everyone else who lived at 742 Clara Street died. Despite a piling death toll, the hospital continued falsifying or contorting information regarding the outbreak. A six-block quarantine was also imposed in Belvedere Gardens in response to two suspected plague deaths.

By November 6, the death toll rose to 33 deaths (reported as 30 in local newspapers). That same day, El Heraldo de México became the first local newspaper to transparently report on the outbreak, revealing that the plague spread by rat fleas, not pneumonia, was its cause. The newspaper also refuted city officials' claims that the plague outbreak began on October 30. Consequently, the Port of Los Angeles began the eradication of all rats to avoid a quarantine and economic downturn. The Los Angeles government advised those in the Macy Street District not to congregate by or heed to the newspaper.

On November 8, Los Angeles government and hospitals began the rollout of a vaccine. However, it would require the quarantined to leave the restricted area, meaning the vaccine was largely isolated to the sick. The plague vaccine at the time was also largely ineffective against the pneumonic plague, and in those who were vaccinated, the plague often progressed too far for the vaccine to be effective.

On November 10, the Los Angeles County General Hospital superintendent, N. N. Wood, officially reported 9 clinically diagnosed plague cases after weeks of silence on the plague, which was adjusted to 37 on November 11.

On November 13, the quarantine was lifted after 6 days of no new cases.

On November 14, a man named Martin Hernandez, who did not live anywhere near the Macy Street District, died of the plague; his case was not reported to any authorities.

On November 15, the plague was officially declared over by local health officials in spite of lingering active cases of the plague, allowing the introduction of a citywide rat extermination program.

== Epidemiology and pathology ==
=== Transmission ===
The pneumonic plague is the only form of the plague capable of person-to-person transmission, which occurs during droplet-respiration, or breathing, as opposed to other forms of the plague. The 1924 Los Angeles pneumonic plague outbreak was the last instance of aerosol transmission of the plague in the United States. A person is infected when they breathe in particles of Yersinia pestis, a bacterium transmitted by rat fleas, in the air. Alternatively, if the bubonic plague (another form of the plague) goes untreated, the bacteria can spread to the lungs through the bloodstream and cause a secondary case of the pneumonic plague. Pneumonic plague is the most virulent form of plague while the bubonic plague is the most common form. The incubation period can be as short as 24 hours.

Plague can also be transmitted from human corpses or animal carcasses. Pneumonic plague specifically can be transmitted by thorough handling of a corpse or carcass through the inhalation of respiratory drops. Bubonic plague can be transmitted by blood-to-blood contact with bodily fluids.

The pneumonic plague's potency of person-to-person transmission is disputed – it is agreed that Yersinia pestis can spread the pneumonic plague through aerosol transmission of infected droplets, and the bacterium can survive in the air for up to one hour in optimum conditions. Somebody exposed to someone infected with the pneumonic plague can fall ill within 1 to 6 days. However, Jacob L. Kool objects to the supposed high risk of person-to-person transmission in an article titled ""Risk of Person-to-Person Transmission of Pneumonic Plague" in Clinical Infectious Diseases, stating that people are only at risk of exposure to the plague when the disease has progressed to its end stage and the infected begin coughing bloody sputum. Even then, direct and close contact within six feet is required for the plague to spread, according to the Centers for Disease Control and Prevention's National Center for Emerging and Zoonotic Infectious Diseases. Transmission can be prevented by tight-fitting surgical masks and social distancing. Only 11% of patients that contracted the disease actually spread it to another person.

After the 1924 outbreak in Los Angeles, there have been no secondary transmissions (transmission of the disease from a secondary case). Bodily fluids and tissue of an infected animal can still transmit the plague to humans through direct contact if handled improperly, but this is exceedingly rare: today, the World Health Organization reports only 1,000 to 3,000 cases of the plague annually. Zoonosis is often the direct result of an epizootic, a flare-up of a disease in animals analogous to a human epidemic. Though the plague is most common in rural and semi-arid regions of the western United States, epizootics are frequent among rodents in big cities and urban areas with large, diverse specimen populations, as exemplified in this outbreak, the last urban plague epizootic.

There is a large concern that Y. pestis will be weaponized as a bioterrorism agent. Because it is highly infective and can be stored in large quantities, there is a concern that it could be dispersed in a form that is resistant to desiccation or foreign environmental conditions. This is concerning because an aerosol attack would be able to cause cases of pneumonic plague. Currently, Y, pestis is categorized as a 1 of 6 Category A biological agent that poses a threat to national security.

=== Signs and symptoms ===
The pneumonic plague primarily affects the lungs, and common symptoms include fatigue, fever, and pneumonia, the latter of which in turn can cause chest pain, coughing, hemoptysis (bloody sputum), and shortness of breath. The plague may also cause abdominal pain, nausea, and vomiting. If antibiotic treatments, which were not available until 1943, are not administered within 24 hours of the onset of symptoms, the plague will often progress into respiratory failure, shock, and death. Complications of plague include gangrene, meningitis, and pharyngeal plague, with the last two being rare instances. Without early treatment, patients will die due to the high mortality rate of the disease.

=== Diagnosis ===
The pneumonic plague is diagnosed after evaluation by a healthcare worker and a laboratory test of the patient's blood, lymph node aspirate, or sputum confirms infection. Currently, the pneumonic plague is diagnosed after evaluation by a healthcare worker and a laboratory test of the patient's blood, lymph node aspirate, or sputum confirms infection. A rapid diagnostic tests called F1RDT can be used and performed at the patient's bedside, which detects the F1 capsular antigen of Yersinia pestis. Specifically, the sample can be taken from pus from buboes (swellings) or from the mucus from the respiratory track (sputum). Results are given within 15 minutes based on a scale of the intensity of the infection. Diagnostic tests are commonly paired with culturing, serology, and polymerase chain reactions. Improving diagnostic testing for plague is important due to the high mortality rate associated with delayed diagnosis and treatment.

=== Treatment ===
The plague can be treated with a therapeutic antiserum, a treatment first initiated in 1896 by Alexandre Yersin, a bacteriologist, physician, and co-discoverer of Yersinia pestis as the causative bacterium of the plague. The antiserum was first tested on 23 Chinese patients in 1896 in Hong Kong, which resulted in a mortality rate of 9%. The efficacy of antiserum is disputed but it is generally accepted to be successful in mitigating negative effects of the plague: the mortality rates for antiserum-treated patients was 35%, as opposed to 82% for untreated patients. The antiserum was replaced by sulphonamides in the 1930s and then by streptomycin beginning in 1947. However, gentamicin, tetracycline, and chloramphenicol are also effective.

In the 1924 Los Angeles outbreak, the serum was only successfully used on two patients, Mary Costello and Raul Samarano, remaining largely unused. At the time, it was only produced by H.K. Mulford Company laboratories in Philadelphia, Pennsylvania, but was quickly flown the 3,141-mile route via car to Mineola, New York then flown on air mail to Los Angeles via San Francisco.

A vaccine to the plague was first developed in 1897 by Waldemar Haffkine who demonstrated that a heat-killed culture of Y. pestis protected rabbits from infection and was later tested in humans in India. This resulted in an observation of both reduced incidence and mortality in individuals who were immunized. In 1931, Georges Girard and Jean Robic developed a live attenuated vaccine from a strain from Madagascar called EV. However, by the end of the 20th century, vaccines were rarely used outside of Russia due to the prominent side affects and reactions. There is currently not a safe or effective vaccine against the plague for human use despite considerable progress made in the development of one.

== Response ==
=== Initial medical response and concealment ===
The government of Los Angeles consistently ensured that the pneumonic plague outbreak never became public. On October 29, Yersinia pestis, the bacterium causing the plague, was found in the lungs of a plague victim, a finding not released to the public until after the outbreak. As cases piled up, a telegram sent on October 31 recommended federal aid for the city of Los Angeles, replacing the terms "pneumonic plague", "death", and "situation" with code "ekkil", "begos", and "ethos", respectively. Government officials knew the outbreak was attributed to the pneumonic plague well before October 30, when it was first labeled in official government documents. Secretary of the State Board of Health doctor Walter Dickie conducted a test on a guinea pig with a lymph node sample taken from Jesus Lajun before he died. The guinea pig died from the pneumonic plague, yet it took 17 days for an announcement confirming the outbreak was the fault of the plague.

In spite of significant delays in medical announcements, significant preventative measures were still enacted: a quarantine of the eight blocks surrounding Jesús Lajun's residence was quickly imposed, affecting roughly 2,500 residents, most of whom were Mexican immigrants. Medical personnel traveled to each house inspecting residents for signs and symptoms of the plague.

Two years following the outbreak's conclusion, Dickie reported to Governor of California Friend W. Richardson commending the response to the outbreak as "the most outstanding accomplishment" of the year, which was questioned as "historical drift" by Arthur J. Viseltear in a 1974 article published in Yale Journal of Biology and Medicine.

=== Media coverage ===
Los Angeles media coverage of the plague was considered vague compared to that of media outside of the city, often attributing the outbreak to pneumonia, as seen in a subheading in the Los Angeles Examiner reading "Officials Believe Virulent Pneumonia Outbreak Controlled" and a headline in the Los Angeles Times reading "Seven are Dead from Pneumonia," both of which published on November 3. From November 1 to November 5, despite the fact that the plague was confirmed by name, it was referred to as a "strange malady", "pneumonia", "virulent pneumonia", or "malignant pneumonia" by city health officials. The plague was not referred to by name until November 6 by Los Angeles newspapers, by which time the plague was practically over. The justification for the evasion was that pneumonic plague was a technical term that meant "malignant pneumonia". The news blackout was mostly confined to Los Angeles since most Californian newspapers referred to the outbreak correctly. For example, the State Board of Health in Oakland dedicated time to discuss the epidemic on its weekly radio show. Many Los Angeles newspapers also incorrectly depicted Belvedere Gardens and the Macy Street District, both heavily populated by Mexican immigrants, as separate from the City of Los Angeles. Any news reports that did refer to the outbreak by name often portrayed Mexican Americans and their respective neighborhoods as 'menaces.'

By comparison, The New York Times and The Washington Post both referred to the plague by name, even comparing it to the Black Death of the 14th century. Several newspapers outside of Los Angeles covered the deployment of the plague antiserum in early November in detail, including the Chicago Tribune; The Evening World; Herald & Review; The Indianapolis Times; Moon-Journal of Battle Creek, Michigan; New York World; The Philadelphia Bulletin; The Philadelphia Inquirer; The Philadelphia North American; Public Ledger; San Francisco Daily News; and the San Francisco Evening Bulletin.

=== Racism ===
The city's handling of the outbreak reinforced the widespread stereotype that Mexicans were poor and of a degraded class. Due to cramped and often illegal living conditions, rats were prevalent in majority Hispanic neighborhoods, cultivating the belief that the plague was an ethnic trait, as exemplified in a University of California, Los Angeles professor who claimed that Mexicans have a tendency to "huddle together" and therefore spread disease.

Plague discrimination was something that became heavily prevalent as the plague went on. Links of sociability, ethnicity, neighborhoods, and kin all linked to plague discrimination against Mexicans. Certain illustrations that accompanied public health documents described environments with the "typical interior of a Mexican home" as ones that were vulnerable to the plague. Images of homes of people with Mexican ethnicity were linked to cases of plague from these images, curating a perceivable connection between ethnicity and plague transmission for mainstream society.

Discrimination was seen from the leading healthcare workers in California. A comment made by Dickie who stated that a connection between the two initial cases of plague and the second group was that it was explained by "the tendency of the Mexicans to withhold information, especially when they are not fully aware of just why such information is desired".

Institutional racism and poverty also advanced the spread of the plague, as overcrowding, poor ventilation, poor sanitization, and high rodent populations often exacerbate the spread and harshness of the plague. In 1924, Mexican immigrants made up the largest ethnic group living in often dense and unsafe work camps, which flourished under widespread sentiment against Mexican immigrants and workers. Employment discrimination was also frequent as Mexicans were viewed as cheap and expendable, and many perceived Mexican Americans being relegated to working in factories and agricultural fields enclosing Los Angeles. On November 9, 200 Mexican workers at the Biltmore Hotel, most of whom did not live in the Macy Street District, were rehired after previously and controversially being fired. Several Mexican residents believed that quarantine guards and the over 200 armed veterans enforcing the quarantine were holding them against their will. Mexican men often had to convert from Catholicism to Protestantism to be respected, while Mexican women were societally obligated to be trained in proper housekeeping. These racist sentiments were possibly the fault of the misdiagnosis of Jesus Lajun's cause of death as a sexually transmitted infection and bronchopneumonia.

After the plague, health officials recognized the need for programs encouraging safe hygiene practices among the Mexican population. Health officials blamed the plague outbreak on Mexicans' supposed ignorance of proper hygiene, despite actually being the fault of notoriously inferior living conditions and poverty in the Macy Street District. Some health officials even blamed the outbreak itself entirely on Mexican Americans, which Feldinger argues reinforced the pro-segregation views widely held at the time. The response also failed to provide vital access to clean water and sanitary disposal.

=== Rat extermination ===
After the 1900–1904 San Francisco bubonic plague outbreak, squirrels carrying fleas with the Yersinia pestis bacteria were found all throughout California. At the time, it was widely believed that rodents or small animals were directly responsible for spreading the plague, rather than fleas . In response, the City of Los Angeles hired people to systematically eradicate or tag rodents, primarily targeting squirrels.

Following the Los Angeles outbreak, the City of Los Angeles began a citywide rat and ground squirrel extermination program. On November 15, Dickie announced an ordinance requiring Los Angeles residents to maintain a clean household. Violations could result in the destruction of said private property, a consequence that devastated Mexicans. A committee dedicated to the eradication of rats received $250,000 in funding between November 1924 and July 1925 and $500,000 between July 1925 and July 1926. The city established a rat bounty and infected rats were found Downtown, in Beverly Hills, and at the harbor. The city lifted houses 18 inches above the ground and ripped off their siding to allow stray cats and dogs to eat infected rats. Buildings were also sprayed with hydrogen cyanide, rodenticide, and sulfur. Health officials also burned lumber, clothing, and garbage.

Today, only 5 to 15 cases of the plague are reported annually in the western United States, and naturally occurring pneumonic plague is practically nonexistent. The risk of death in people with any type of plague in the United States is approximately 11%.

== See also ==
- Nora Sterry – American teacher and activist (1879–1941)
- Airborne transmission
- Bubonic plague
- Septicemic plague
- Super-spreader
- Outbreak
- Epidemic
- Zoonosis
- Black rat
