= Ruth Sterry =

American suffragette and writer (1883–1938)

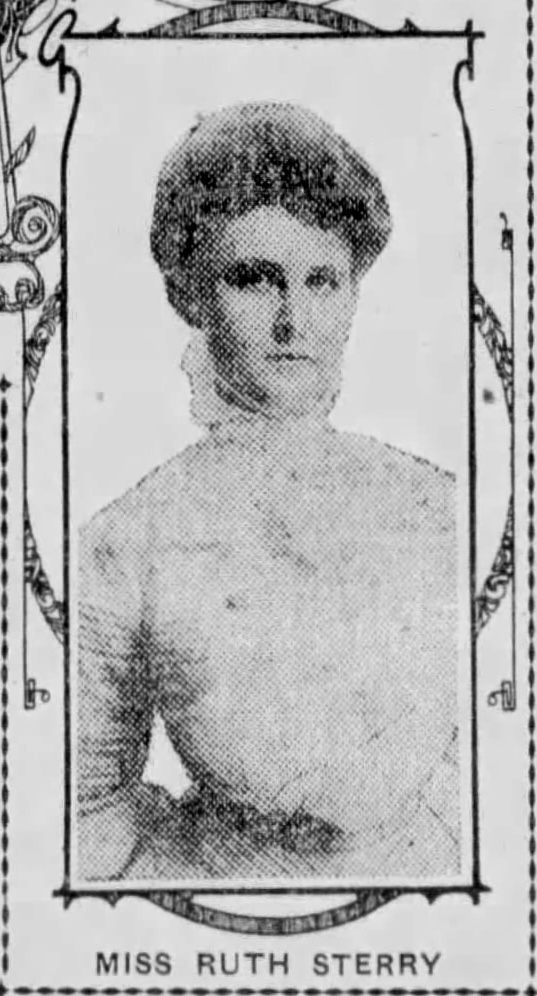
- "Demand Ballot for Women – Miss Ruth Sterry" (L.A. Evening Express, Jan. 28, 1911)
- Born: May 11, 1883; Emporia, Kansas, U.S.
- Died: June 3, 1938 (aged 55); Sunset Beach, California, U.S.

Ruth Sterry (May 11, 1883 – June 3, 1938) was an American suffragette, political activist, newspaperwoman, publicist, lobbyist, poet, and advocate for working mothers.

== Biography ==
Ruth Sterry was born in Emporia, Kansas in 1879, the daughter of Clinton Norman Sterry (1843–1903) and Louise Augusta Slocum Sterry (d. 1931). She had two brothers, Norman Sterry, and Philip Sterry, both "white shoe" lawyers, and a sister, the public school teacher and administrator Nora Sterry. Her father, Clinton Sterry, had been a lawyer for the Santa Fe railroad. Sterry moved to California with her family in 1896, and attended public schools in Los Angeles.

Louise and Ruth Sterry worked together to organize "a day care center for poor working women" at what would later become L.A. Children's Hospital. Ruth and her mother were both prominent suffragettes in Los Angeles County, California. In 1911, after returning from a lobbying trip in support of California Proposition 4, which would amend the state constitution to grant the political franchise to women, Sterry told the Political Equality League in Los Angeles:

"Before going to Sacramento we were fond of laughingly asserting that it was the voice of the past which spoke to us from the anti-suffrage camp, but after listening to that voice in various committees and in the senate chamber itself, we heard the inflection of a deadlier voice than that—the sinister whisper of the special interests, of the powers that speak so stealthily as to be almost unnamable, are menacing not only woman's suffrage but men's suffrage as well—even the very principles of our democracy...What did one of their speakers mean when she said to the elections committee: 'We believe in the republican form of government; we believe that this government is still in an experimental stage and that we will awaken to find that we have opened the door of the franchise too wide?' We have come to believe our fight is not alone for the privilege of the ballot in women's hands—we are fighting for manhood's suffrage, for self-government by all the people."

Raised as a society girl in a high-status family, Sterry started her working life as a newspaperwoman, writing primarily for the Los Angeles Herald. As one account put it, "Possessing a very engaging manner, combined with a forceful personality, Miss Sterry was a successful newspaper woman and journalist from 1910 to 1918." According to 1911 west-coast media-industry scuttlebutt, Sterry was fired from the Los Angeles Tribune that year because her politics were Socialist and she supported Job Harriman's candidacy for L.A. mayor. The L.A. Record reported the news with the comment, "Ruth Sterry is a newspaper woman and a capable one...Inasmuch as it is a matter of common knowledge that a number of the men employees of the Tribune are going to vote for Harriman, it is being asked if they, too, are likely to lose their jobs, or if this particular war is only on women?" During World War I, Sterry did communications and publicity for the U.S. government, as well as volunteering as a nurse. She was present at the 1920 Democratic National Convention.

"SALUTATION"
Ruth Sterry (1913)

Did you choose the journey, friend?
No, nor I;
But to make it cheerfully, Let us try.
When the day is dark, I pray,
Sing a song to cheer the way,
For tomorrow we will be
One day nearer to the sea.

Did you choose the journey, friend?
No, nor I;
But we know the end will come
By and by.
All today we bear the load
Up the weary winding road,
But tomorrow we may be
At the Inn in company.

Around 1920 Sterry quit journalism, and she opened her own public relations and political advocacy firm. She described herself as occupied with publicity and advertising from 1918 to 1932. Under the headline, "Women Should Know Who Pays for Influential Indignation," the Los Angeles Record editorial page asked in 1923, "What weight for instance would a speech by Miss Sterry against the water and power act have carried if it had been known that this clever young-lady had been paid $4019 by the corporations to do publicity organize the Women’s Tax and Bond Study clubs and 'generally circulate among the club women of Los Angeles and among the parent teacher associations?'" In 1930 the L.A. Record described her as "one of the smoothest power trust propagandists in the city". Sterry was also a founding director and organizer for Neutral Thousands, a group of women that initially purported to promote "peaceful labor-industrial relations" but later turned out to be an anti-union shill group funded by corporations.

Sterry served for many years as a president of the Los Angeles Women's Political League. The Women's Political League promoted female candidates for public office; other members of the group included Dora Stearns and Irene Martin Bowron, later First Lady of Los Angeles. From January to June 1921 Sterry was a Los Angeles Parks Commissioner.

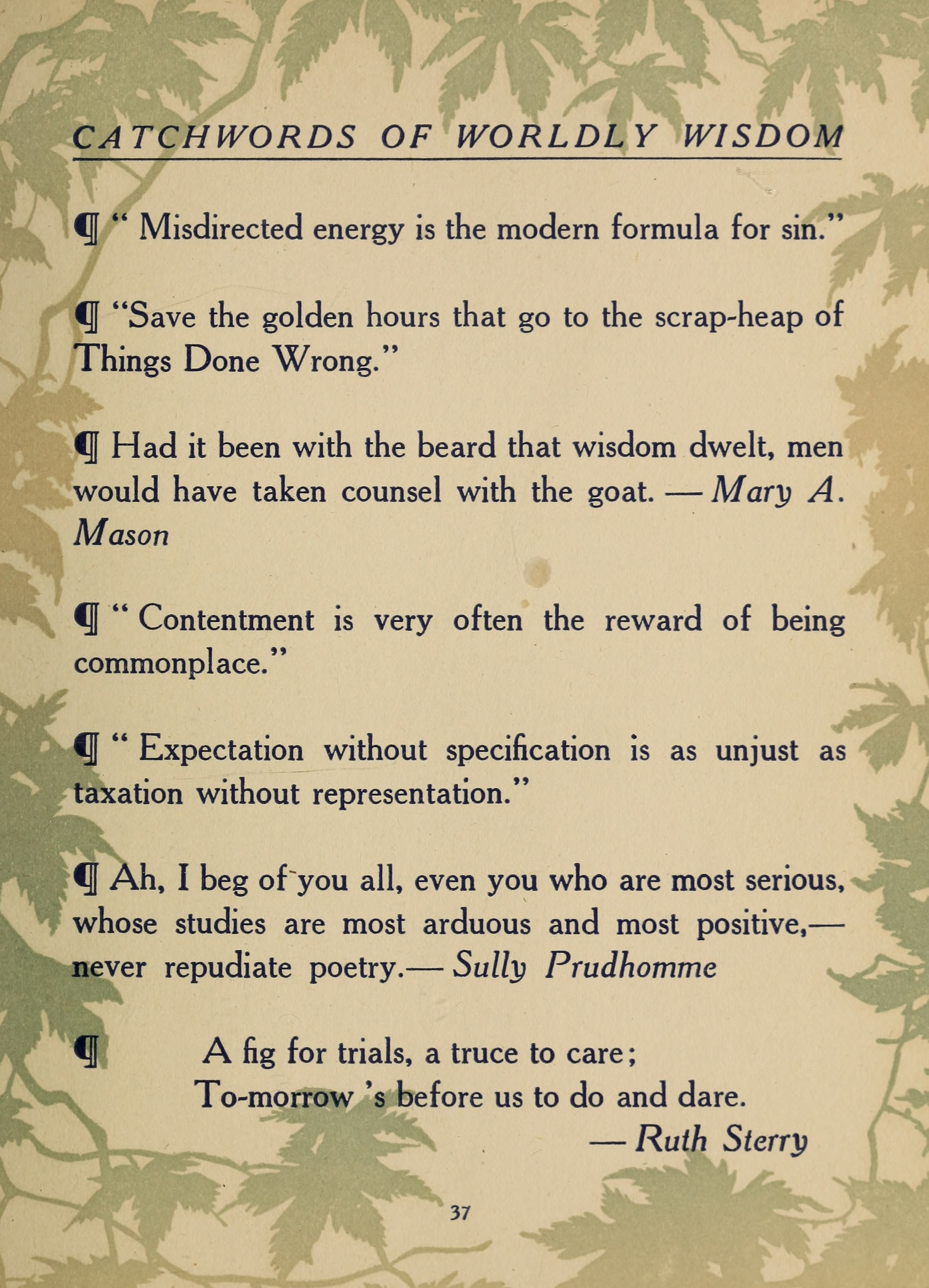
Catchwords of Worldly Wisdom, 1909

Sterry wrote a number of poems that were published in magazines and newspapers; at least one of her poems was anthologized. She was also said to have written articles and novels under a secret pen name. In 1933 the Los Angeles Record reported Sterry was working on her second novel somewhere near the coast. Sterry considered herself retired from the publicity business as of 1935.

Sterry died of a heart attack in 1938 at the Los Angeles home she shared with her sister. Ruth Sterry was a single mother by choice and was survived by her adopted son, Charles Churchill Sterry.

== See also ==
- Women's suffrage in California
- Timeline of women's suffrage in California
- List of California suffragists
- Timeline of Los Angeles

== Sources ==
- Feldinger, Frank (2008). A Slight Epidemic: The Government Cover-Up of Black Plague in Los Angeles...What Happened and Why It Matters. Aberdeen, Washington: Silver Lake Publishing. ISBN 978-1-56343-885-1. OCLC 191727582.
- Martin, [unknown]; Wallace, Clare (1941) [June 1935], "Sterry, Miss Ruth" (PDF), California Biographical File, Works Progress Administration – via Los Angeles Public Library
- Starr, Kevin (1996). Endangered Dreams: The Great Depression in California. Americans and the California Dream. New York: Oxford University Press. ISBN 978-0-19-511802-5. LCCN 95002662. OCLC 31970166.
