= Hollenbeck =

Hollenbeck may refer to:

== Places in the United States ==
- Hollenbeck Middle School, Los Angeles, California
- Hollenbeck Park, Boyle Heights, Los Angeles, California
- LAPD Hollenbeck Division, part of Los Angeles Police Department, California
- Hollenbeck Hall, listed on the National Register of Historic Places in Wapello County, Iowa

== Other uses ==
- Hollenbeck (surname)

== See also ==
- Hollenback (disambiguation)
