= Lankershim, Los Angeles =

- Lankershim, Los Angeles County, California (1896–1927), pre-annexation settlement, place name and rail stop, or neighboring West Lankershim, both predecessors to today’s North Hollywood
- North Hollywood, Los Angeles
