= Lankershim, California =

Lankershim, California may refer to:

- Lankershim, Los Angeles County, California or West Lankershim, annexed by the city of Los Angeles and renamed to North Hollywood in 1927
  - Lankershim Boulevard, which runs through the area
- A station of San Francisco and San Joaquin Valley Railroad in Madera County, California
