= Norman Sterry =

American lawyer (1878–1971)

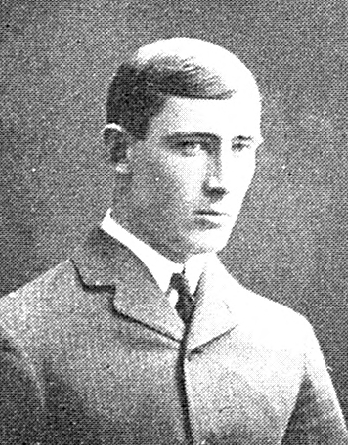
- Photograph of Sterry from the 1903 University of Michigan yearbook

Biographical details
- Born: July 8, 1878; Emporia, Kansas, US
- Died: February 3, 1971 (aged 92); Los Angeles, California, US

Playing career
- 1900–1902: Michigan
- Positions: Halfback, end

Norman Sedgwick Sterry (July 8, 1878 – February 3, 1971) was an American lawyer and college football player. He represented movie stars and prominent persons as a lawyer in Los Angeles and successfully represented Major League Baseball in the case that resulted in the United States Supreme Court's exemption of baseball from the antitrust laws. As a law student at the University of Michigan, Sterry played at the halfback and end positions on the Michigan Wolverines football teams from 1900 to 1902.

== Early years ==
Sterry was born in Emporia, Kansas in 1878, the son of Clinton Norman Sterry (1843–1903) and Lousie Augusta Slocum. He was educated in the public schools in Kansas. In 1892, his father, who was an attorney, became the general attorney for the Santa Fe Railroad in the region west of Albuquerque. In October 1896, at age 18, Sterry moved with his family to Los Angeles. He had two younger sisters, Nora and Ruth, and a younger brother, Philip.

Sterry received his further education at Meaney's Private School for Boys and the University of New Mexico.

== University of Michigan ==
In 1900, Sterry enrolled in the Law Department at the University of Michigan and received his law degree in 1903. While at Michigan, Sterry played at the halfback and end positions on the Michigan Wolverines football teams from 1900 to 1902. He was a member of Fielding H. Yost's 1901 and 1902 "Point-a-Minute" football teams that compiled a 22–0 record and outscored opponents 1,197 to 12.

Sterry's father died in May 1903, the same month Sterry was admitted to the Michigan bar.

== Legal career ==
After receiving his law degree, Sterry returned to Los Angeles and was admitted to the California bar in October 1903. By 1910, he had partnered with the founders of what became one of California's most prominent law firms, Gibson, Dunn & Crutcher. As of 1918, he was one of six lawyers listed as members of Gibson, Dunn & Crutcher. Sterry remained with the Gibson Dunn firm throughout his career, serving as a senior partner at least into the 1950s.

During the 1910s, Sterry was counsel for the Los Angeles Railway and other large companies operating in Los Angeles. In the late 1920s, Sterry represented silent film star Lillian Gish in lawsuits involving slander which received national press coverage due to the salacious allegations.

In the mid-1930s, Sterry also gained national attention for a suit in which he alleged silent film star Mary Miles Minter had been systematically cheated out of her earnings by her mother. Sterry alleged that Minter had earned over $1 million, but she did not have lunch money and was left impoverished by the mother. The case was ultimately settled in the middle of the proceedings.

Sterry also represented dime-store heiress Barbara Hutton in a child custody dispute with her former husband Cary Grant in the 1940s.

In 1953, Sterry, then a senior partner at Gibson, Dunn & Crutcher, successfully represented the New Yankees in a case before the United States Supreme Court, Toolson v. New York Yankees, 346 U.S. 356, which upheld an exemption from the antitrust laws for Major League Baseball.

== Family and death ==
In 1909, Sterry married Josephine Lewis. At the time of the 1910 United States census, Sterry and his wife lived in Los Angeles with Sterry's mother, Louise, and his three siblings.

Sterry and his wife had a daughter, Louisa, and a son, Lewis Trask Sterry. At the time of the 1920 United States census, Sterry was living in Los Angeles with his wife and two children. At the time of the 1930 United States census, Sterry lived on South Rossmore Street in Los Angeles with his wife, two children, and two servants.

He died in February 1971 at age 92.
