= Nora Sterry =

American teacher and activist (1879–1941)

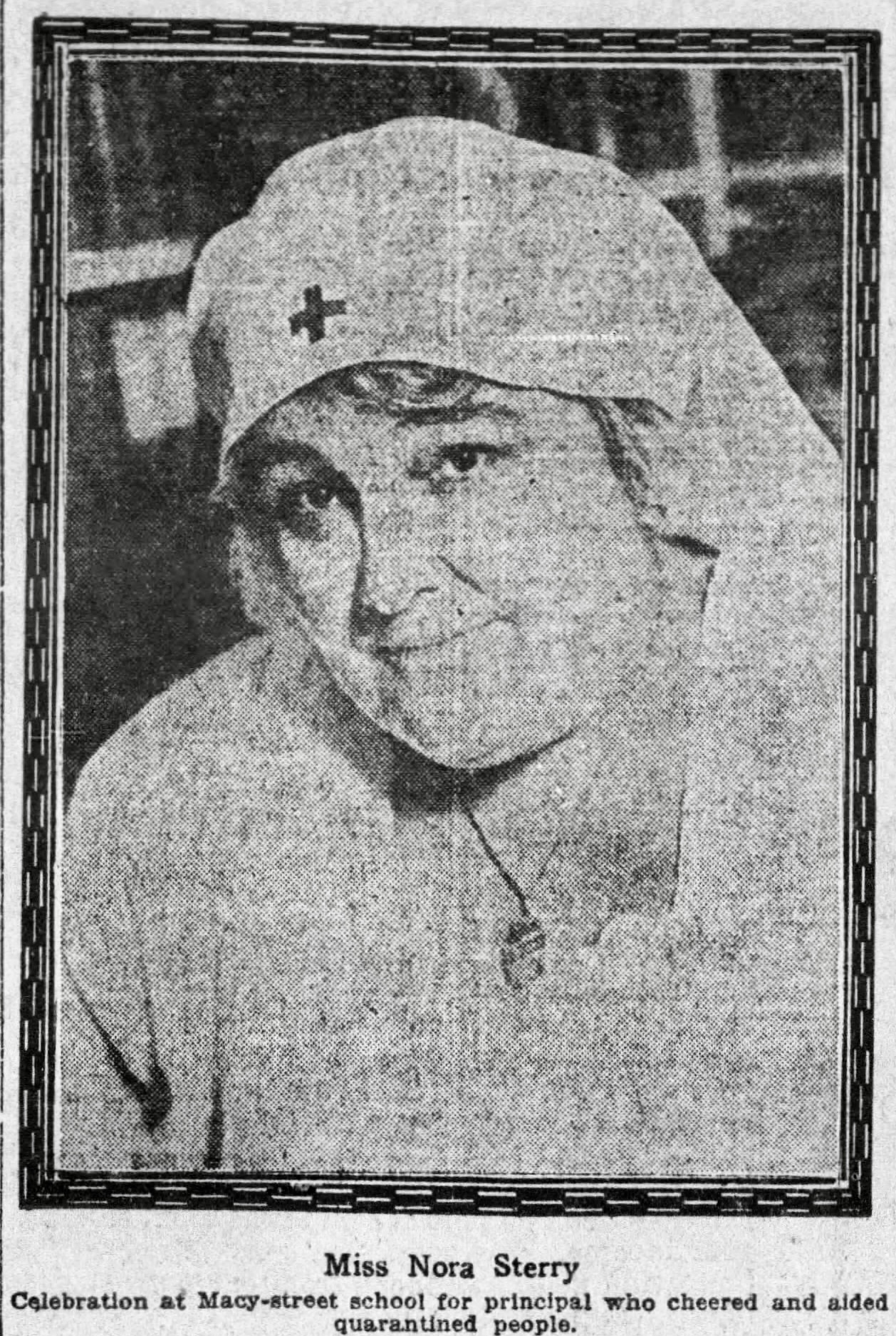
- Born: October 28, 1879; Emporia, Kansas, U.S.
- Died: April 13, 1941 (aged 61); Los Angeles, California, U.S.

Nora J. Sterry was an American teacher, school administrator, social worker, and public official in California. She is best remembered today for her work during the 1924 Los Angeles pneumonic plague outbreak. Nora Sterry Elementary School in west Los Angeles is named in her honor.

== Biography ==
Nora Sterry was born in Emporia, Kansas in 1879, the daughter of Clinton Norman Sterry and Louise (Slocum) Sterry. She had two brothers, Norman Sterry, and Philip Sterry, both "white shoe" lawyers, and a sister, newspaperwoman Ruth Sterry. Her father, Clinton Sterry, had been a lawyer for the Santa Fe railroad.

The 1924 version of "Greater love hath no man" now reads "greater love hath no woman than that she risk her life for the children under her care." When medals for bravery are passed around they will be paging Nora Sterry, for 12 years principal of Macy street day and night schools. She is this year's example of double-distilled concentrated extract of courage. This school is a typical melting pot sometimes 24 nationalities represented in its 600 pupils and very few Americans. When the quarantine was established on Saturday Miss Sterry was at home. The only way she could get back to her charges was as a Red Cross nurse. Her first act on getting back to her school was to run up the American flag. She has always emphasized the protection as well us obligation of citizenship and the Stars and Stripes mean more to her foreign charges than they do to many Americans. In a few hours' time she had knocked the panic that reigned into a cocked hat, established relief headquarters, and arranged for help in the way of outdoor relief.

— Ruth McClintock Los Angeles Times, November 11, 1924

Sterry moved to California with her family in 1898 and started working as a teacher in Los Angeles schools around 1903. In 1924, at the time of the Los Angeles bubonic plague outbreak, Sterry was the principal of Macy Street Elementary School. Under her leadership the school was a model for community-provided social services and early intervention: it had a food bank, a diaper bank, childcare, workshare programs, and healthcare including a makeshift infirmary and regular dental examinations. There was also a lending library of books and board games that provided educational materials to parents as well as the children. The Los Angeles Board of Education did not subsidize any of Macy Street's "extras," rather funding for the extra services came from local charities, local families, local businesses, and from the sale of arts and crafts produced by the kids.

When news of the bubonic plague outbreak resulted in a quarantine of the Macy Street district, Sterry was initially prohibited from entering the area. After being turned away by guards despite her protests that she needed to get to the school, she told them that when they saw the American flag raised over the school they would know she had gotten through. On November 3, 1924, at 9 a.m., the flag was raised and Sterry spent the next two weeks within the quarantine zone, feeding the neighborhood from the school food bank as the community rode out a bubonic and pneumonic plague outbreak. She is remembered for "having done everything imaginable to improve the unconscionable living conditions in Macy Street" and then "hurled herself into harm's way, sharing the plague dangers of the marginalized community" to which she had devoted more than 20 years of her life. In 1927 she convinced the Southern Pacific railroad to donate five acres of land for the construction of a children's playground near Macy Street.

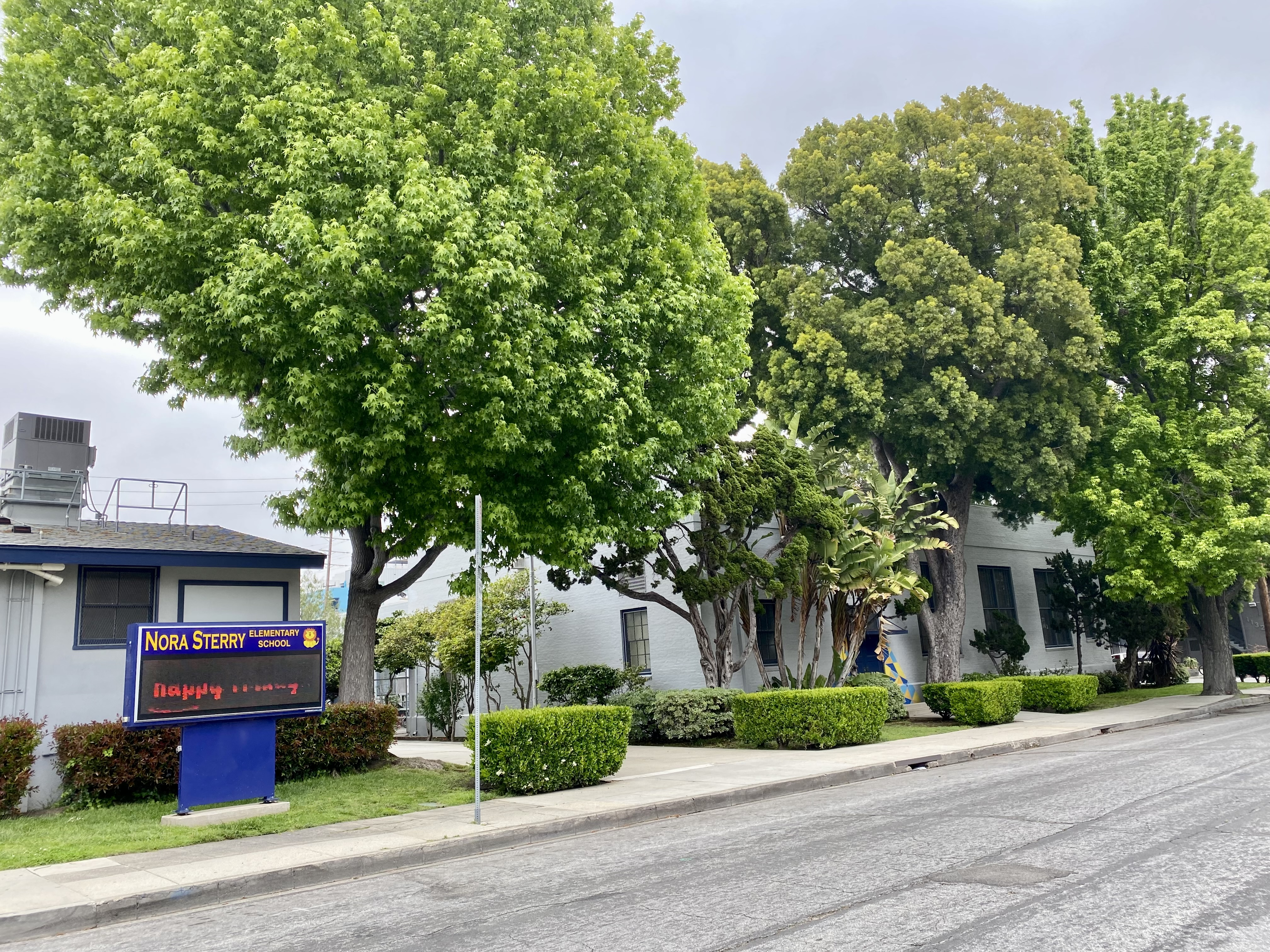
Nora Sterry Elementary School in the Sawtelle neighborhood of Los Angeles (2023)

Sterry served at one time as editor of the Los Angeles School Journal. In 1930, Sterry was transferred to Sawtelle Boulevard School, which was a teacher training school operated by USC. At the same time she was appointed to the Los Angeles County Board of Education and eventually served as board president. She died at her home on April 13, 1941. After her death, Sawtelle Boulevard School was renamed Nora Sterry in her honor.

== See also ==
- Old Chinatown
- Sonoratown
