= Lankershim =

Lankershim may refer to:

== People ==
- Isaac Lankershim (1818–1882), early developer of Los Angeles' San Fernando Valley
- James Boon Lankershim (1850–1931), son of Isaac Lankershim

== Places ==
- Lankershim Hotel, a now-demolished hotel on the corner of Broadway and 7th Avenue in Downtown Los Angeles
- Lankershim Hotel, San Francisco
- Lankershim station of the San Francisco and San Joaquin Valley Railroad in California
- Lankershim Boulevard, a major north–south thoroughfare in Los Angeles' San Fernando Valley
- Lankershim, Los Angeles County, California (1896–1927) an archaic placename for what is now North Hollywood, Los Angeles, or adjacent West Lankershim (?–1927)
- Lankershim Depot in North Hollywood, built 1896 as Toluca Depot of the Southern Pacific Railroad, used 1911–1952 as dual Southern Pacific-Pacific Electric station
- Lankershim Reading Room, LAHCM 978, see list of Los Angeles Historic-Cultural Monuments in the San Fernando Valley
- Lankershim Arts Center in North Hollywood
- Lankershim Elementary School in North Hollywood
