= Peromyscopsylla =

Scientific classification
- Kingdom: Animalia
- Phylum: Arthropoda
- Class: Insecta
- Order: Siphonaptera
- Family: Leptopsyllidae
- Genus: Peromyscopsylla; Fox, 1939

Genus of fleas

Peromyscopsylla is a genus of fleas belonging to the family Leptopsyllidae.

The species of this genus are found in Europe and Northern America.

Species:

- Peromyscopsylla bidentata (Kolenati, 1863)
- Peromyscopsylla catatina Jordan, 1928
