= Amphipsylla =

Scientific classification
- Kingdom: Animalia
- Phylum: Arthropoda
- Class: Insecta
- Order: Siphonaptera
- Family: Leptopsyllidae
- Genus: Amphipsylla; Wagner, 1909

Genus of fleas

Amphipsylla is a genus of fleas belonging to the family Leptopsyllidae.

The genus was first described by Wagner in 1909.

The species of this genus are found in Eurasia and Northern America.

Species:

- Amphipsylla rossica Wagner, 1912
