= Chinese Cemetery of Los Angeles =

Cemetery in California, United States

- Interactive map of Chinese Cemetery of Los Angeles

Details
- Established: 1922
- Coordinates: 34°2′11″N 118°10′20″W
- Type: Private
- Owned by: Chinese Consolidated Benevolent Association of Los Angeles
- Website: Official website
- Find a Grave: Chinese Cemetery of Los Angeles

The Chinese Cemetery of Los Angeles is one of several historical cemeteries found around East Los Angeles, including Evergreen and Calvary cemeteries. Located at First Street and Eastern Avenue in the Belvedere Gardens section of East Los Angeles, today the cemetery is now bordered on the south by the Pomona Freeway (60) and on the east by the Long Beach Freeway (710).

The cemetery was established by the Chinese Consolidated Benevolent Association of Los Angeles (CCBA) in 1922 to provide burial grounds for Chinese residents in Los Angeles, as at the time, all cemeteries in Los Angeles barred anyone of Chinese descent from purchasing burial plots.

CCBA also owns a section of the Forest Lawn Memorial Park in the Hollywood Hills that also functions as a Chinese Cemetery.

== Background ==
Racism against persons of Chinese descent in Los Angeles and the United States during the 19th Century was the primary driving force behind the creation of the Chinese Cemetery as well as the reason Union Station displaced the original Chinatown during the same time period.

An estimated 10,000 Chinese lived in Los Angeles during the late 19th century. Almost all were men who came to work on the railroads. Due to the Chinese Exclusion Act and other laws targeting the Chinese, they could not marry U.S. citizens or own property, and they were limited to only a few occupations such as launderers and house boys or undesirable jobs such as ditch diggers. They were banned from most shops and public institutions and were the target of racist violence that often went unpunished. They were also barred from burial in all locations except a city owned potter's field.

== History ==
The only place that allowed burial of Chinese persons was an indigent graveyard or "Potters Field" at Lorena and 1st streets, adjacent to Evergreen Cemetery. At the time, it was owned by the City and then County of Los Angeles. The founders of Evergreen Cemetery gave the city a 9-acre (36,000 m^{2}) parcel of the proposed cemetery in 1877 for use as a potter's field in return for a zoning variance to allow the cemetery.

The Chinese community was allowed to utilize a corner of the city's potter's field and erected a shrine in September 1888. Unlike white indigents, who were buried at no charge, the Chinese had to pay US$10 to be interred.

Ownership of the indigent cemetery passed from the City to the County of Los Angeles in 1917. At the time, it was clear the potter's field would have burial space for only a few more years, so the Chinese community responded by purchasing land and opening the Chinese Cemetery.

Meanwhile, the county used the founding of the new cemetery as an opportunity to extend the useful life of the potter's field. Norman Martin, Superintendent for the County Department of Charities, wrote a letter to Chan Kai Sing, Secretary of the Chinese Chamber of Commerce. In the letter, dated June 19, 1923, he wrote:

"Recently your people established a new Chinese cemetery on East 1st Street, and it would be highly desirable if the bodies buried in the county cemetery could be transferred to your new location,"

Despite acknowledging that each grave cost the Chinese US$10, and that there were 902 people buried there, Martin said he wanted the remains moved to the new cemetery and offered $2 per body as compensation. "The idea being that you would move all of the bodies as fast as practicable."

Evergreen Cemetery purchased most of the 9-acre (36,000 m^{2}) potter's field from the county in 1964, and the area was prepared for new burials by being covered with 8 feet (2.4 m) of compacted soil. The Chinese shrine remained at Evergreen, and was later purchased by the Chinese Historical Society of Southern California in 1992, and soon after restored.

During the summer of 2005, Metropolitan Transit Authority (MTA) construction workers widening First Street for the Gold Line light rail extension uncovered the skeletal remains of 174 people buried near the south side of the Los Angeles County Crematorium, adjacent to Evergreen Cemetery. Archaeologists working for the agency determined that the excavation site was likely the Chinese section of the potter's field. The majority of the remains were Asian males found along with rice bowls, jade bracelets, Chinese burial bricks, Asian coins and opium pipes. The remains were reburied inside Evergreen Cemetery, near the Chinese Shrine. A memorial was dedicated on March 7, 2010.

== Chinese Cemetery ==
Due in part to anti-Chinese zealotry in the United States along with the inability to bury their dead outside the soon to be full potter's field, the Chinese community through CCBA purchased land in 1922 for its own cemetery at the corner of First Street and Eastern Avenue. At the time, a plot cost $30. After World War II, additional parcels adjacent to the cemetery were purchased and annexed to the cemetery. Even then, the cemetery is small and neatly arranged with tight lines of mostly 2–3 foot headstones, etched in Chinese and English.

Families regularly come to pay their respects, clean the headstones and leave flowers and other offerings, generally on holidays such as Ching Ming (Chinese Memorial Day) and Ch'ung-Yang Chieh (Hungry Ghosts or All Souls' Day).

By 2006, the cemetery was in need of work, so the CCBA refurbished the cemetery and built the "Offer of Respect" Pavilion.

== Future ==
The future of the cemetery may be impacted by plans to expand the 710 and 60 freeways that are adjacent to the cemetery. The options chosen have not had serious effect on the Chinese Cemetery but it is possible that future freeway growth will require encroachment into the cemetery site.
