= Hollenback =

Hollenback can refer to:

- Bill Hollenback (1886–1968), American football coach
- Hollenback Township, Luzerne County, Pennsylvania

== See also ==
- Hollenbeck (disambiguation)
