= Rat flea =

A rat flea is a parasite of rats.

There are at least four species:

- Oriental rat flea (Xenopsylla cheopis), also known as the tropical rat flea, the primary vector for bubonic plague
- Northern rat flea (Nosopsyllus fasciatus). According to Prince, "... it too is an efficient vector of plague. It was found to be even more widely distributed than X. cheopis, occurring in 12 of the 13 States surveyed".
- Xenopsylla brasiliensis, a vector of bubonic plague, found in South America, Africa, and India
- Leptopsylla segnis
