= Louise Leung Larson =

American journalist (1905–1988)

- Born: February 16, 1905; Los Angeles, California
- Died: October 1, 1988 (aged 83)
- Education: University of Southern California, 1926
- Occupation: Journalist
- Years active: 1926–1975

Louise Leung Larson (February 16, 1905 – October 1, 1988) was a Chinese American journalist, who was the first Asian American reporter to work on a mainstream daily newspaper, the Los Angeles Record.

== Early life ==
Larson was born Mamie Louise Tom on February 16, 1905, to Tom Cherng How and Wong Bing Woo, who were originally from Guangdong in China. Her parents married in 1895 and by 1902 the couple were settled in Los Angeles. Her father changed the family name from Tom to Leung. He was a self-taught herbalist and ran a successful business treating both Chinese and white American patients.

Larson grew up in a wealthy family, with six siblings and several servants, which was unusual for Chinese American households at the time. Additionally, Larson's household growing up included people of many different races including white women working as receptionists for her father's business, and Chinese and black folk assisting with meal preparations, child care, and household work.

The family experienced racism, and her father, like many other Chinese American herbalists, was targeted and arrested many times. Larson experienced racism notably during World War II when she was mistaken for being Japanese.

== Career ==
Leung attended Los Angeles High School, graduating in 1922, and enrolled at the University of Southern California where she graduated Phi Beta Kappa with a degree in English in 1926. The same year she was recruited as a reporter for the Los Angeles Record, where she became the first Asian-American person to work as a journalist for an American daily newspaper. Her first story was on Chinese customs, and as a result of its success she was hired by the paper to work on civil and criminal court reporting.

During the 1930s and 1940s, Larson worked for newspapers including the San Francisco News, the Chicago Daily Times, the Los Angeles Times Sunday Magazine, and the Los Angeles Daily News. She reported on high-profile cases such as the tax evasion trial of Al Capone in 1931, Albert Einstein's activism around peace and disarmament, and Madame Chang Kai-Shek's 1942 visit to America. She also reported on celebrities such as Anna May Wong, Aimee Semple McPherson, and Charlie Chaplin. She wrote about society murder trials and also worked on assignments relating to Chinese American life such as Kang Yu-Wei's visit to Los Angeles Chinatown and even Chinese extras in Hollywood films.

She wrote under several names, including: Mamie Louise Leung, Louise Leung, and Louise Larson, as well as Hilda Hoover and Jane Logan.

Following her divorce, in 1958, Larson returned to journalism to support her family. She wrote about local politics in Topanga and Malibu for the Santa Monica Evening Outlook. After retiring in 1975, she continued to send in editorial comments to newspapers.

Her memoir, Sweet Bamboo, was first published by the Chinese Historical Society of Southern California in 1989.

== Personal life ==
In 1929, she married Arnold Larson, who was also a journalist, and the couple lived in Chicago, before returning to California. They had three children: Stanley (born 1930), Jane (born 1945) and Daniel (born 1948). The couple divorced in 1950. Her brother, Monroe, was a comic artist and illustrator, while her grandniece Sierra Katow is a comedian.

Leung Larson died on October 1, 1988, following complications after she had a stroke.

== Legacy ==
Larson donated her father's archive to University of California, Los Angeles, where it is available to researchers as the Tom Leung Archival Collection of the Chinese Royal Society in the Early Twentieth Century.

== Awards ==
- Asian American Journalists Association – Honor Roll (1988)
- Asian Pacific Women's Network (1983)
