= Nuy (disambiguation) =

Nuy (Persian: نوي) is a village in West Azerbaijan Province, Iran.

Nuy or NUY may also refer to:

- Nuy River, Western Cape, South Africa, dammed by the Keerom Dam
- Annelies Nuy (born 1960), Dutch fashion designer
- Nunggubuyu language (ISO 639: nuy)

== See also ==
- Van Nuys (disambiguation)
