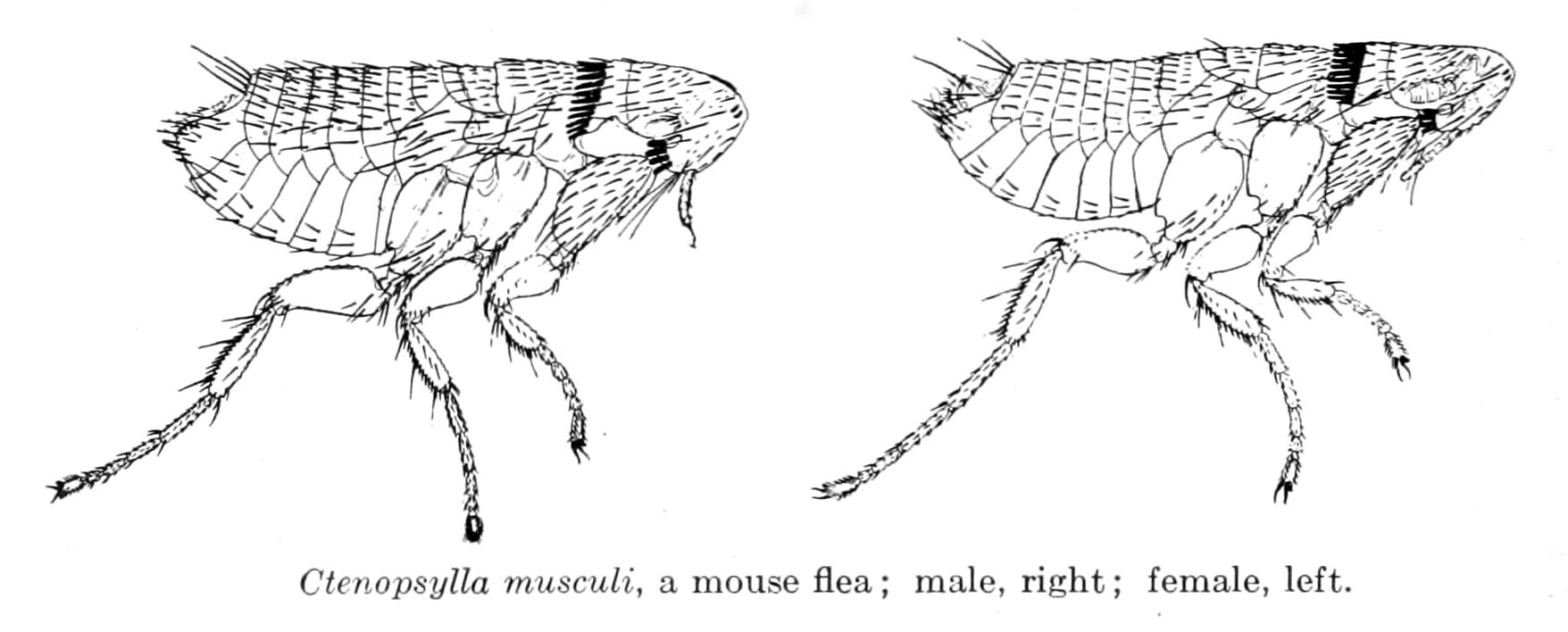
- Ctenopsylla musculi, mouse flea

Scientific classification
- Kingdom: Animalia
- Phylum: Arthropoda
- Class: Insecta
- Order: Siphonaptera
- Family: Leptopsyllidae; Rothschild & Jordan, 1915

= Leptopsyllidae =

Family of fleas

Leptopsyllidae is a family of fleas in the order Siphonaptera. There are at least 30 genera and 250 described species in Leptopsyllidae.

== Genera ==
- Aconothobius
- Acropsylla
- Amphipsylla
- Brachyctenonotus
- Caenopsylla
- Calceopsylla
- Chinghaipsylla
- Conothobius
- Cratynius
- Ctenophyllus
- Desertopsylla
- Dolichopsyllus
- Frontopsylla
- Geusibia
- Hopkinsipsylla
- Leptopsylla
- Leptosylla
- Mesopsylla
- Minyctenopsyllus
- Ochotonobius
- Odontopsyllus
- Ophthalmopsylla
- Ornithophaga
- Paractenopsyllus
- Paradoxopsyllus
- Pectinoctenus
- Peromyscopsylla
- Phaenopsylla
- Sigmactenus
- Tsaractenus
- Typhlomyopsyllus
