= Yale Journal of Biology and Medicine =

- Discipline: Biology, medicine, medical education
- Language: English

Publication details
- History: 1928–present
- Publisher: PubMed Central (United States)
- Frequency: Quarterly
- Open access: Yes
- License: Creative Commons Attribution License
- Impact factor: 3.549 (2019)

Standard abbreviations
- ISO 4: Yale J. Biol. Med.

Indexing
- CODEN: YJBMAU
- ISSN: 0044-0086 (print); 1551-4056 (web)
- LCCN: sg37000070
- OCLC no.: 909890653

Links
- Journal homepage

The Yale Journal of Biology and Medicine is a quarterly peer-reviewed open-access medical journal. It was established in October, 1928 and is the oldest medical student publication still being published. Since 2015, each issue covers a particular topic in biology, medicine, or public health, including experimental and clinical research. The journal's editorial board is composed of Yale University graduate, medical, and professional students. It is published on PubMed Central and is financially supported by the Yale Office of Medical Education.

== History ==
The journal was established in 1928 by Milton C. Winternitz, dean of the Yale School of Medicine from 1920 to 1935. During his tenure, Winternitz instituted what became known as "The Yale System of Medical Education", which eliminated required course exams and comparative grades, allowed for flexibility of course requirements in students' schedules, and encouraged students to carry out original thesis research and writing. The journal originally served as an outlet to publish students' thesis research and as a tool for students to practice scientific writing and learn how to publish as scientists and researchers.

All published articles dating back to 1928 are available on PubMed Central.

== Abstracting and indexing ==
The journal is abstracted and indexed in Index Medicus/MEDLINE/PubMed and Scopus.

== Colloquium series ==
The journal sponsors a series of quarterly seminars to run in parallel with each issue, featuring a Yale faculty member whose research expertise aligns with the topic featured in the issue. The colloquia are free and open to the public.

== Podcast series ==
The journal also creates a series of podcasts with discussions with editors, authors, and Yale faculty researchers and clinicians.
