= Leptopsylla =

Scientific classification
- Kingdom: Animalia
- Phylum: Arthropoda
- Class: Insecta
- Order: Siphonaptera
- Family: Leptopsyllidae
- Genus: Leptopsylla; Jordan & Rothschild, 1911

Genus of fleas

Leptopsylla is a genus of fleas belonging to the family Leptopsyllidae. The species Leptopsylla segnis was named by Carl Johan Schönherr in 1811.

== Leptopsylla segnis ==
Leptopsylla segnis, commonly known as the European mouse flea, is a widely distributed flea with the common host being the house mouse (Mus musculus). Severe infestations can cause anaemia. Adults have a both a genal and pronotal ctenidium.
