= Dora A. Stearns =

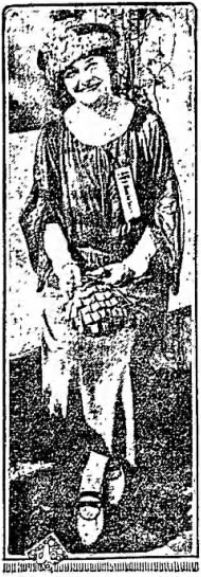
Dora A. Stearns

Dora A. Smith Stearns (1883 – February 2, 1942) was very active in civic and club affairs and a leader in the movement for drafting and passing the minimum wage law for women in California.

== Early life ==
Dora A. Smith was born in 1883 in Los Angeles, California, daughter of Zira Bruce Smith (1835–1880) and Sarah Jane Scott (1852–1936). She was born on the family ranch near Oxford Avenue and Temple Street.

== Career ==
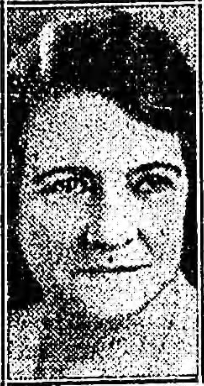
Dora A. Stearns, May 7, 1936, Los Angeles Times.

Dora A. Stearns was very active in civic and club affairs.

She was member of the State Board of Education and member of the City Planning Commission.

She served on the Board of Freeholders that framed the City Charter.

She was president of the Los Angeles Chapter of the Drama League of America; of the Public School Protective League; of the Women's Political League; of the Women's City Club, of the Los Angeles County Council of Republican Women, of the Women's Law Observance League, of the Busy Bee Home for Children.

She was a member of the Ebell of Los Angeles, Women's Athletic Club, Republican Study Club, Republican County Central Committee. She was charter member of the Wilshire Chamber of Commerce.

In 1923 she ran for State Senator and she was a suffragist before women were given the right to vote. She was a leader in the movement for drafting and passing the minimum wage law for women in California.

In 1934 she was named member of the Los Angeles County Board of Education, a position she held until her death.

In 1936, as a member of the Women's Law Observance Association, she lobbied to secure an amendment to the county ordinance to separate liquor sales from dance halls. Moreover she led a committee of investigation on liquor sales to minors.

== Personal life ==
Dora A. Smith married James B. Stearns, of the Edgemont Land Company, and lived at 2632 Monmouth Ave., Los Angeles, California.

In 1929 she separated from her husband.

She died on February 2, 1942, at her home, 4320 W. Second St., Los Angeles, and is buried at Evergreen Cemetery, Los Angeles.
