= Los Angeles Evening Record =

Evening daily newspaper (1895–1933)

Los Angeles Record
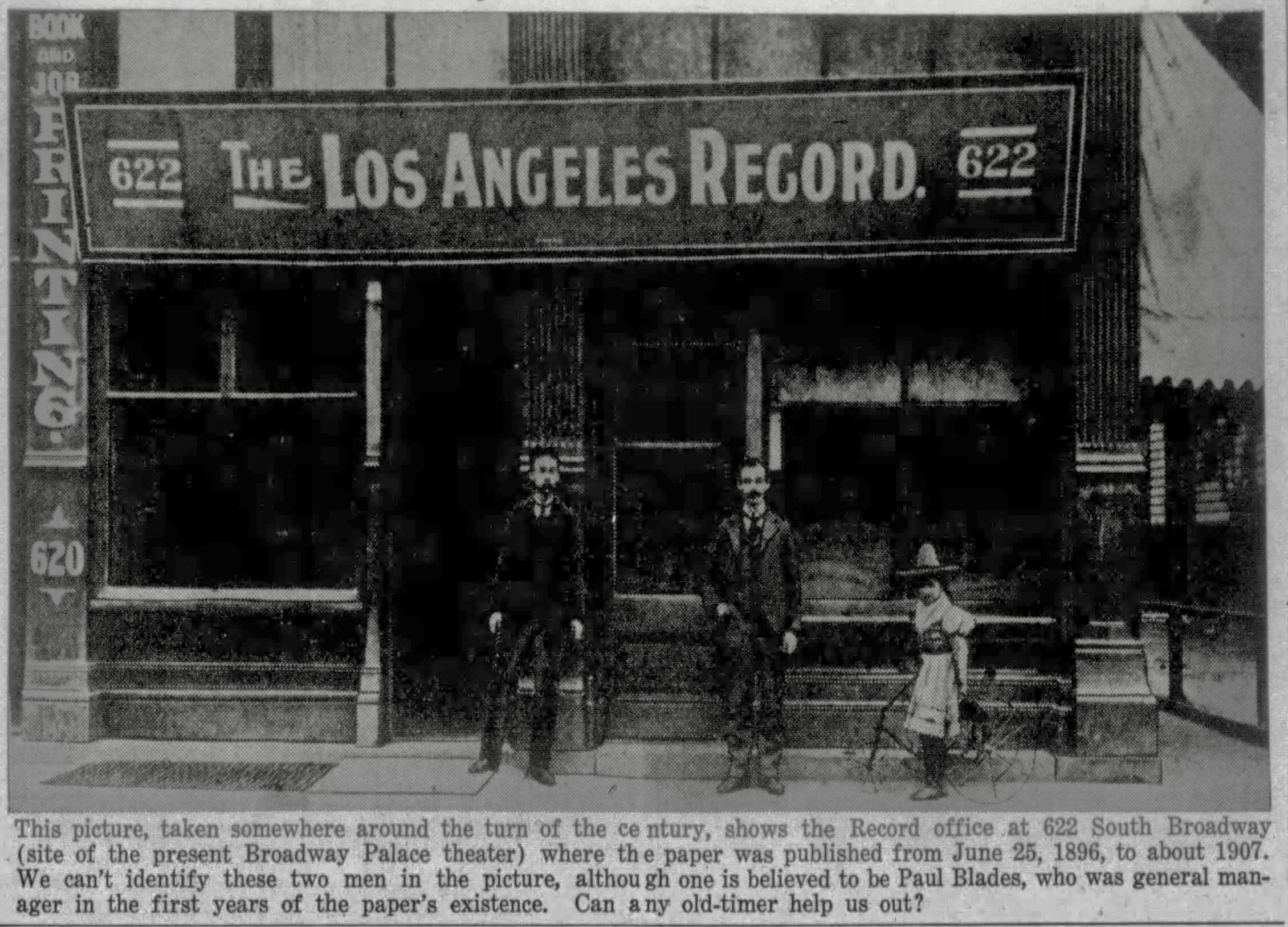
- Los Angeles Record office in 1902 at 622 South Broadway; on the left is Arthur L. Mackaye, the courts reporter, and on the right is likely Walter Syverston, the circulation manager
- Founded: March 4, 1895; 131 years ago
- Ceased publication: December 12, 1933 (or 1936ish?)

The Los Angeles Record was a daily newspaper of the Greater Los Angeles area of California, United States in the first half of the 20th century. Associated with the Scripps chain of newspapers, it was founded on March 4, 1895. The Record was an evening newspaper, perceived to be politically independent, and its offices were on Wall Street for much of its 20th-century history. In the 1920s, the Record was one of six dailies competing for readership in the city. The newspaper ultimately developed a fairly populistic, working-class editorial approach that stood out amongst the city's dailies, especially compared to the arch-capitalist Los Angeles Times.

== History ==
Circa 1904 it was credited with the removal of LAPD Chief of Police Charles Elton after the paper charged him with protecting illegal gambling rings. Among its editorial practices of the early 1900s was baiting Pacific Electric magnate Henry E. Huntington because, argued Record editorials, "company owners forced employees to operate the trolleys at excessive speed and were interested primarily in profits instead of human lives." The paper also opposed William Mulholland's planned Los Angeles Aqueduct as exploitative of Owens Valley. It was the Record that published the so-called "haybag letters" that mayor Charles E. Sebastian wrote to his longtime mistress, in which he referred to his wife as "the Old Haybag".

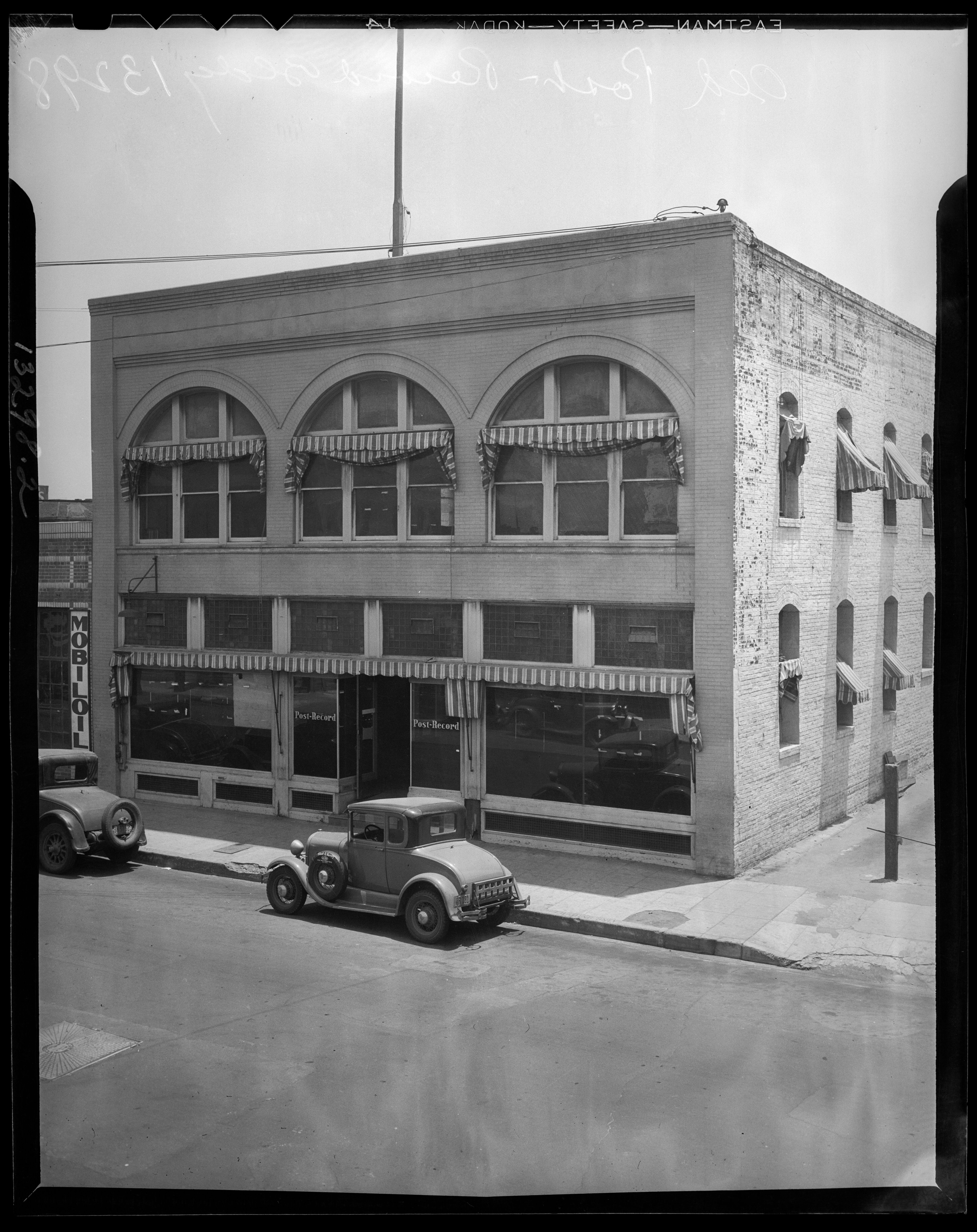
Late 1930s photograph of "Old Post-Record Building," almost certainly the office at 612 Wall Street

The paper survived until December 12, 1933, when it became the Los Angeles Post-Record. The Post-Record, or Los Angeles Evening Post-Record, survived another couple years into the mid-1930s, maybe 1936.

== Notable personnel ==
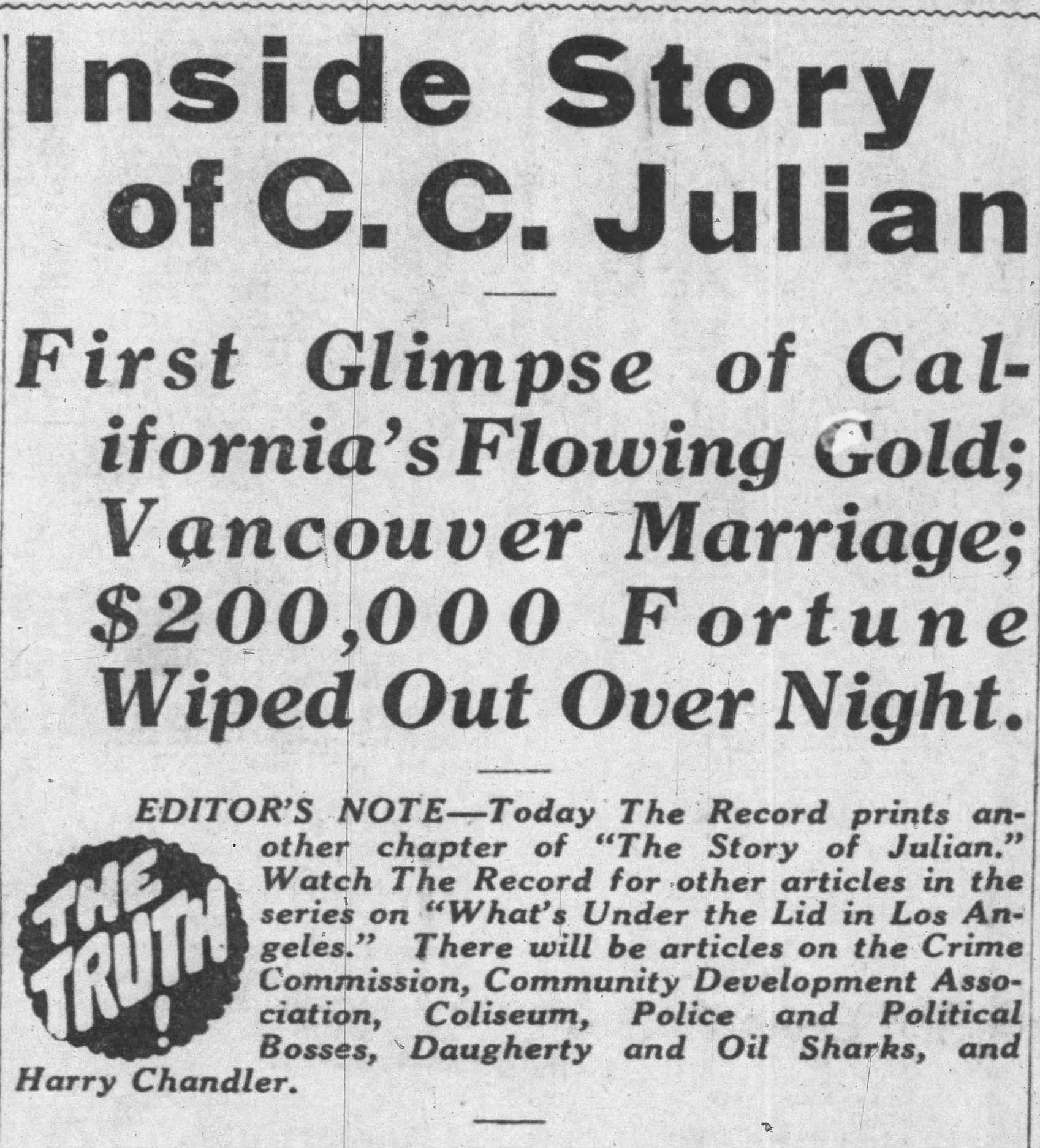
Los Angeles Record exposés of the 1920s, like this one on the Julian Pete scandal, were often marked with an ink splot labeled "The Truth!"

- E. E. McDowell, called Mac, was the editorial cartoonist from 1903 to ~1934
- Dana Sleeth, editor 1916–?
- Burton Knisely, editor, early 1920s
- Henry B. R. Briggs was editor and publisher from 1925 to 1933.
- Notable reporters included Mamie Louise Leung, considered the first Chinese-American female newspaper reporter, and Agness Underwood, a crackerjack crime reporter, who started her career at the Record.
