= Van Nuys (disambiguation) =

Van Nuys is a neighborhood in the San Fernando Valley of the city of Los Angeles, California.

Van Nuys may also refer to:

== People ==
- Edgar Van Nuys Allen (1900–1961), American doctor
- Frederick Van Nuys (1874–1944), United States Senator
- Isaac Newton Van Nuys (1836–1912), American businessman, farmer and rancher, namesake of the Los Angeles neighborhood
- James Van Nuys, American artist who created statues for Rapid City, South Dakota
- Laura Bower Van Nuys, author of the memoir that was the basis of the 1968 Disney film The One and Only, Genuine, Original Family Band

=== Fictional ===
- Bethany Van Nuys, a character in the American TV series Mad Men
- Patricia Van Nuys, character played by Dorothy Gish in the 1920 American silent film Flying Pat
- Robert Van Nuys, character played by James Rennie in the 1920 American silent film Flying Pat

== Places ==
- Van Nuys, a neighborhood of San Fernando Valley in Los Angeles, California, U.S.
  - Van Nuys Boulevard, a major arterial road through the central San Fernando Valley
- Vanuys, Sherwood Forest, Memphis, Tennessee, U.S.
- Byzantine Catholic Eparchy of Van Nuys of the Byzantine Catholic Church, in California, U.S.

=== Facilities and structures ===
- Van Nuys station, a train station in Van Nuys, L.A., California, U.S.
- Van Nuys station (Los Angeles Metro), a bus station in Van Nuys, L.A., California, U.S.
- Van Nuys/San Fernando station, a light rail station in Pacoima, L.A., California, U.S.
- Van Nuys Airport (ICAO: KVNY; IATA: VNY), Van Nuys, L.A., California, U.S.
- Van Nuys High School, Van Nuys, L.A., California, U.S.
- Van Nuys Assembly, a GM automotive factory in Van Nuys, L.A., California, U.S.
- Van Nuys Farm, a historic home and farm in Johnson County, Indiana, U.S.

== Entertainment ==
- Van Nuys Blvd. (film), a 1979 American comedy
- "Van Nuys", an episode of Law & Order: LA, an American TV series
- "Van Nuys", an episode of American TV series Weeds
- "Van Nuys", a song on the 2007 album The Heroin Diaries Soundtrack by Sixx:A.M.

== Other ==
- SS I. N. Van Nuys, a Liberty ship launched in 1944

== See also ==
- Nuy (disambiguation)
