= Hollenbeck (surname) =

Hollenbeck is a surname. Notable people with the surname include:

- Conrad Hollenbeck (1847–1915), American politician and judge
- Don Hollenbeck (1905–1954), American newscaster and commentator
- Harold C. Hollenbeck (born 1938), American politician
- John Hollenbeck (musician) (born 1968), jazz drummer and composer
- John Edward Hollenbeck (1829–1885), American businessman in Nicaragua and Los Angeles
- Ky Hollenbeck (born 1987), American kickboxer
- Larry Hollenbeck (born 1949), American NASCAR driver
