= Lankershim, Los Angeles County, California =

Archaic settlement name and train stop, now North Hollywood

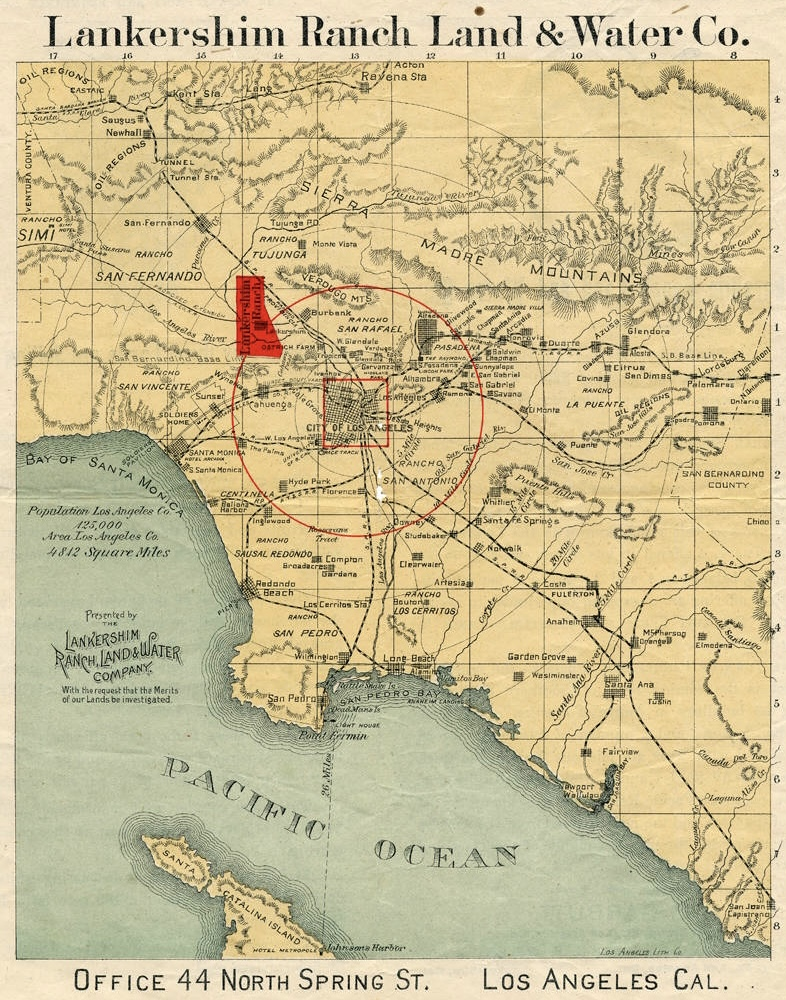
Lankershim Ranch Land and Water Company 1890 marketing map

Lankershim and West Lankershim are historical names for an area in what is now the greater North Hollywood section of the San Fernando Valley region of Los Angeles County, California.

== Settlements ==
Lankershim was originally named Toluca. The center of the town, laid out by James Boon Lankershim and his brother-in-law I.N. Van Nuys, was the "intersection of present day Chandler Blvd. and Lankershim Blvd." Lankershim agreed to be annexed to the City of Los Angeles in 1923. The intent of annexation was to connect the settlement's access to the water from the Los Angeles Aqueduct system. West Lankershim agreed to be annexed to the City of Los Angeles in 1919. West Lankershim has been described as the "Valley Plaza area of North Hollywood" or as basically what is now called Valley Village.

The name of the local post office was changed from Toluca to Lankershim in 1912. In 1925 the population of Lankershim was 2,000. The current name North Hollywood was adopted August 15, 1927 to capitalize "on the glamour of Hollywood to the southeast." The post office address was legally changed that day and "all the signs along Magnolia Boulevard, Lankershim Boulevard and other large highways have been painted out from signs and the new name substituted."

== Depot ==
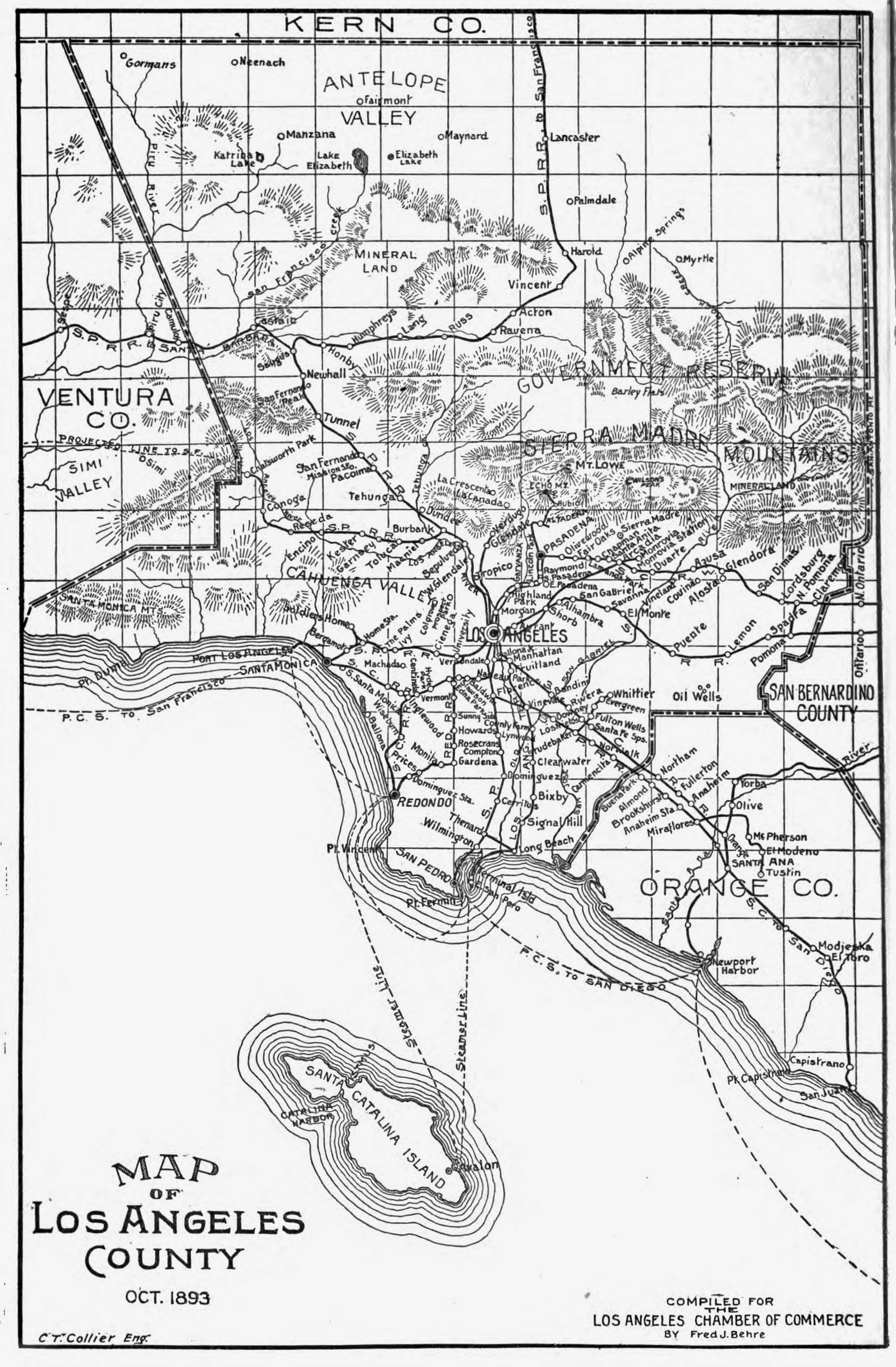
"Toluca" on a map of Los Angeles County published October 1893 for the World's Columbian Exposition

Lankershim station opened 1886 as a Southern Pacific depot called Toluca and later functioned as a Pacific Electric station until 1952. It now houses a coffee shop across from the current NoHo station.

== Library ==
The Lankershim branch of the Los Angeles Co. Free Library was established November 1914 and located at the "newspaper office." The Lankershim branch was located at 11228 Margate Avenue c. 1921. The Lankershim branch officially joined LAPL in February 1924, and was renamed in 1927 and became the Sidney Lanier branch. The branch moved to its current location in 1929.

== Gallery ==
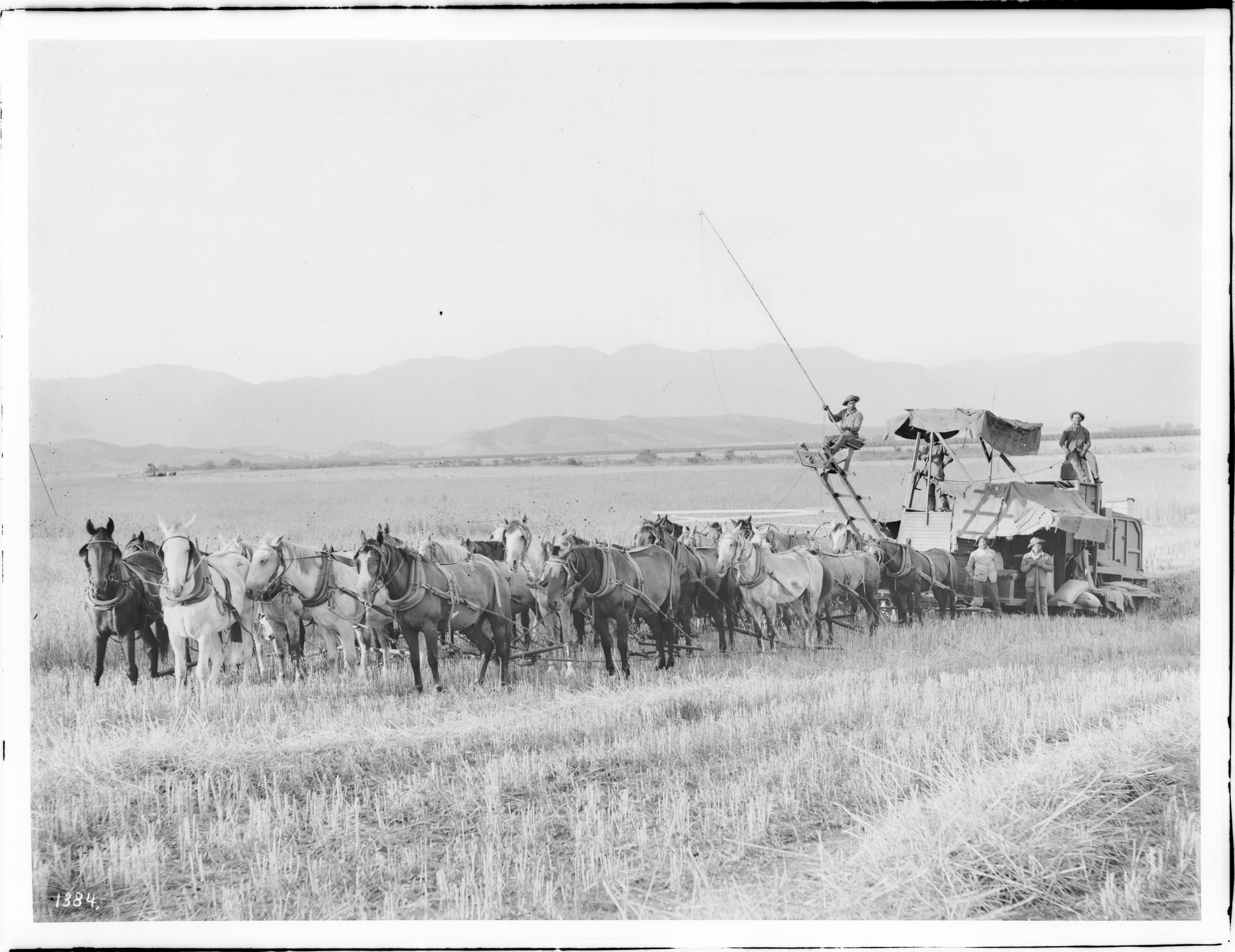
Twenty-horse harvester at work in a Van Nuys-Lankershim field owned by Los Angeles Farming and Milling Company c. 1905–1908

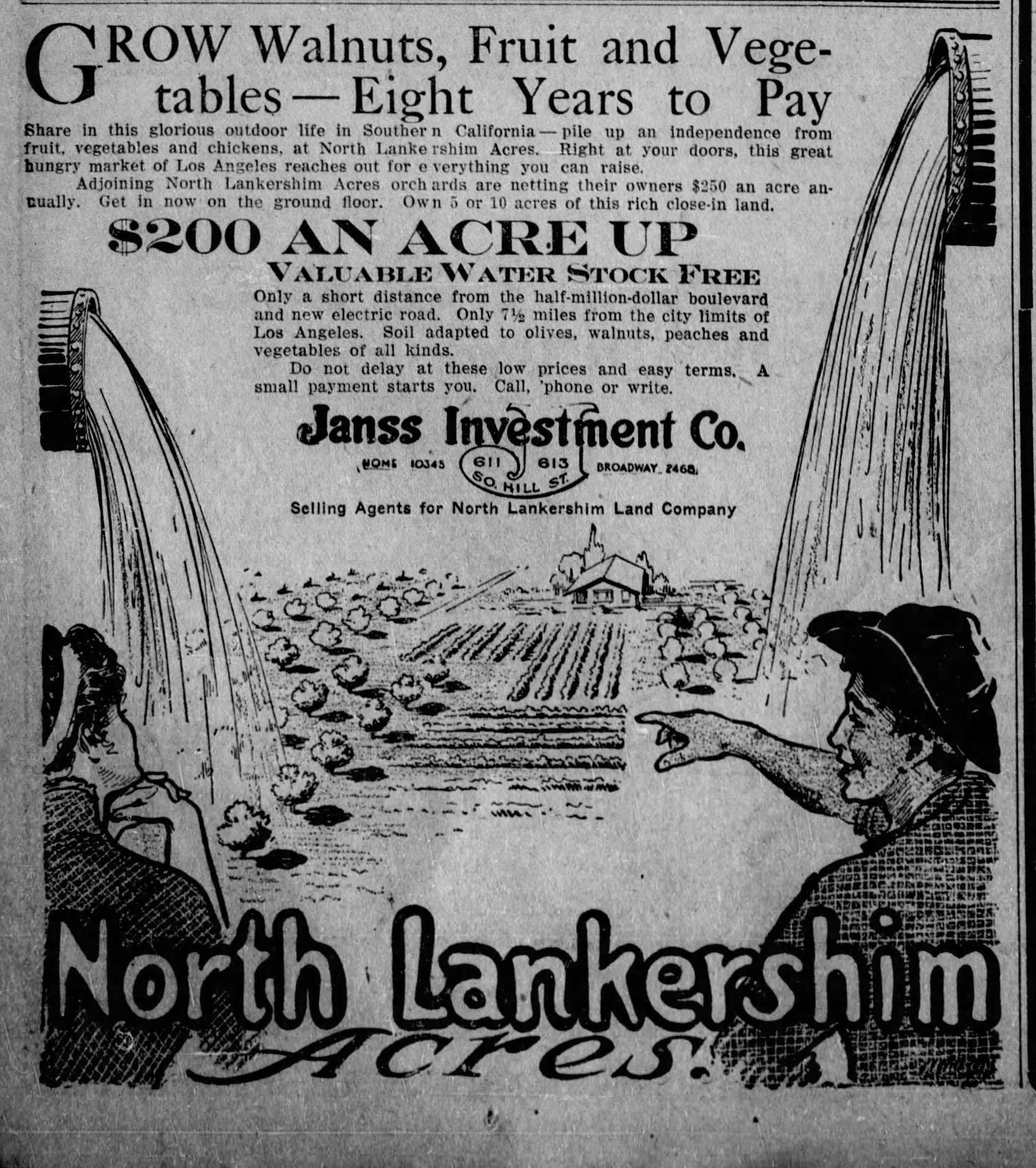
"North Lankershim Acres" The Los Angeles Times, February 9, 1913

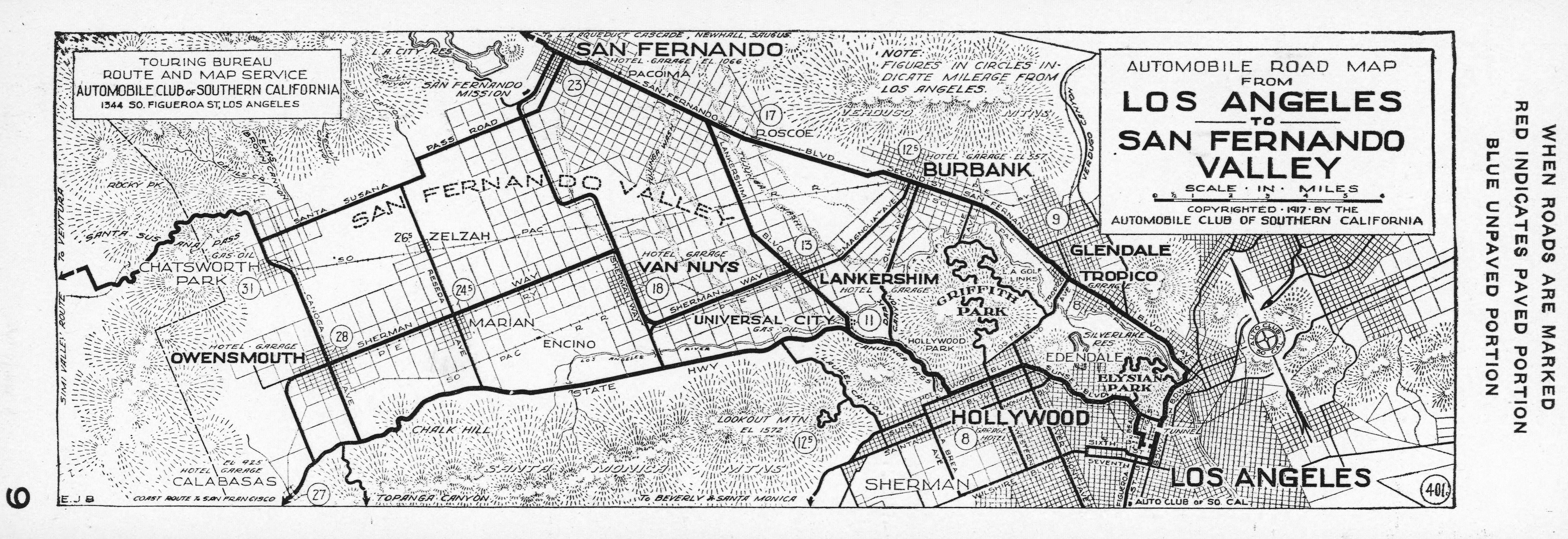
Lankershim on automobile route map, 1917

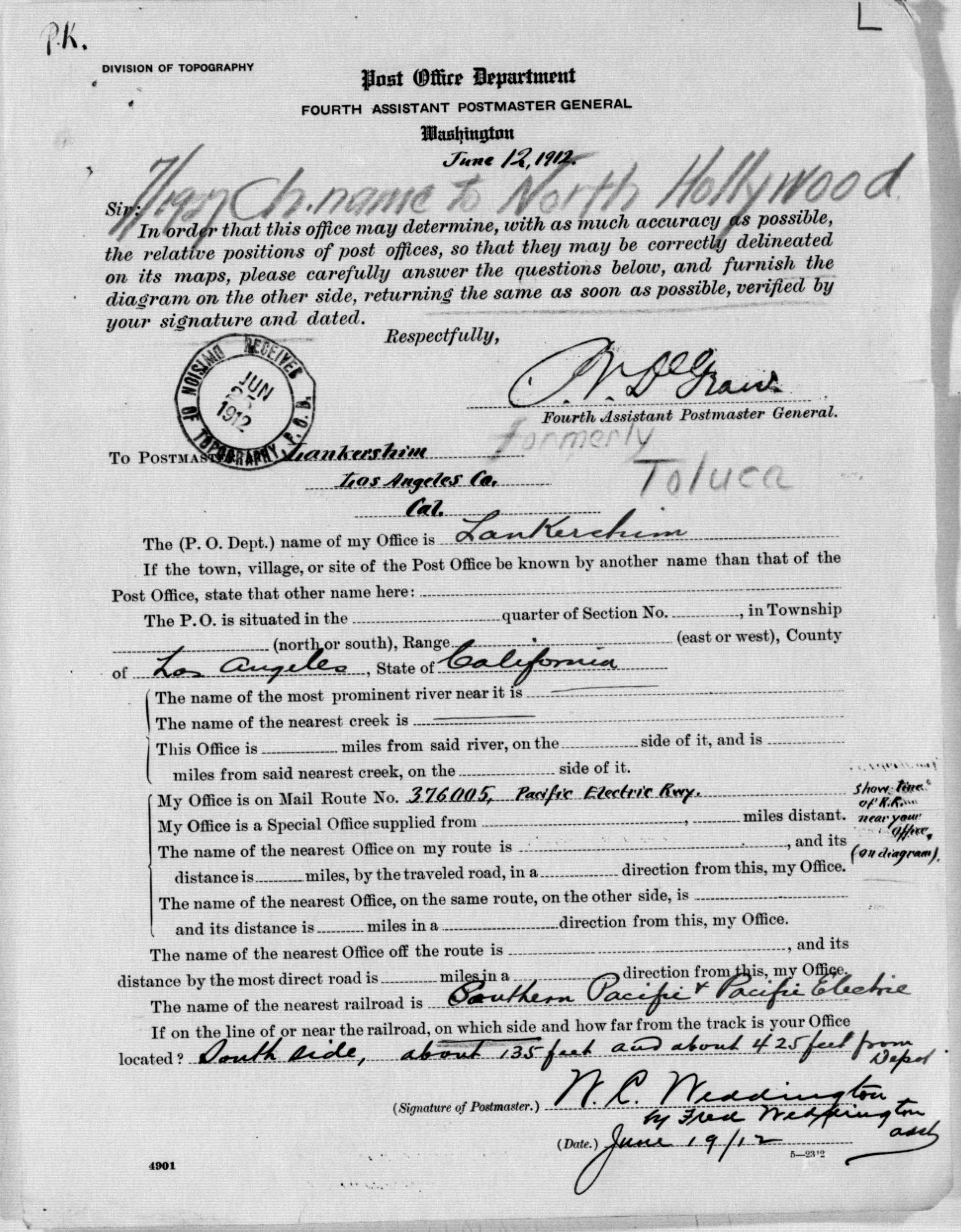
Lankershim post office application

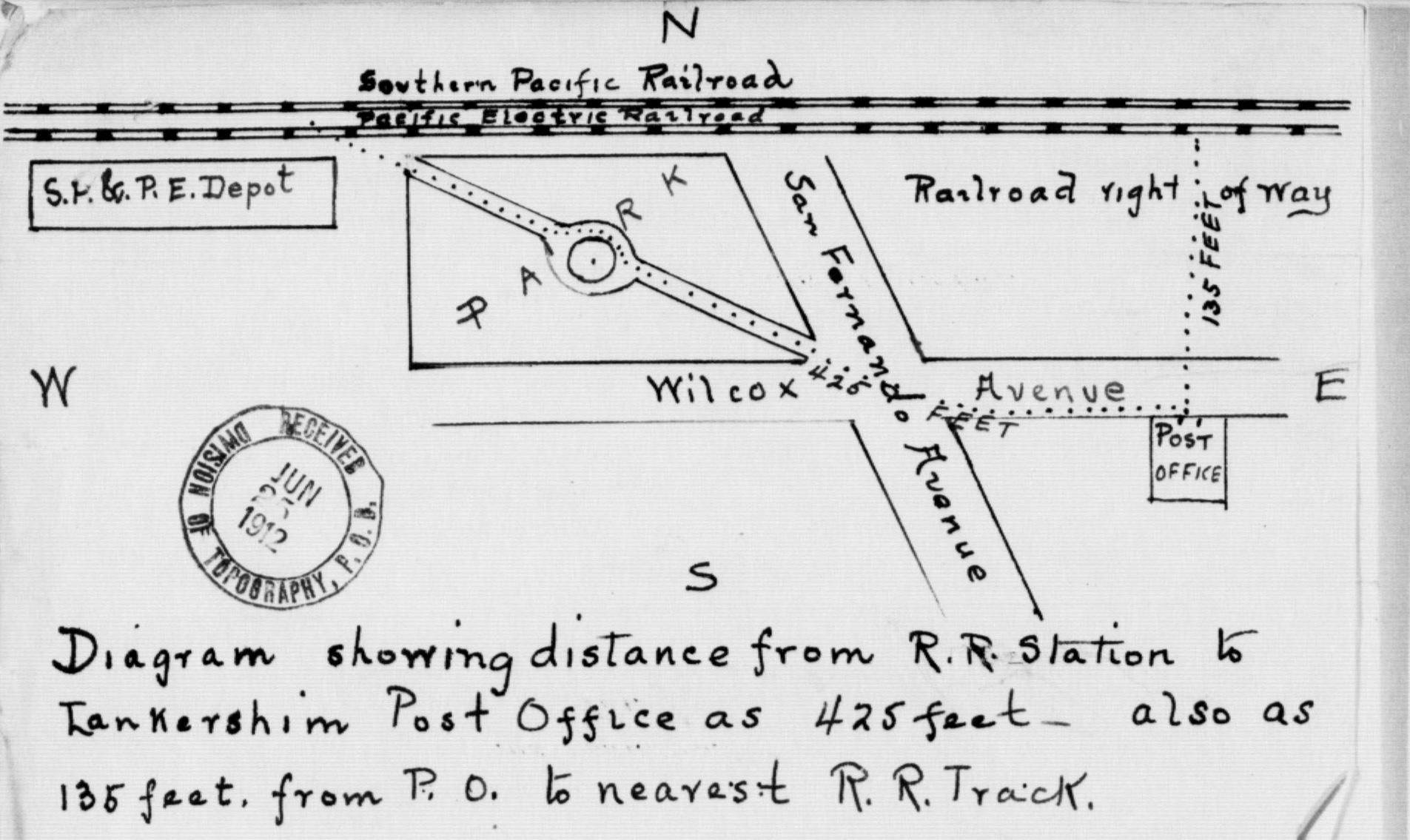
Map attached to post office name change application

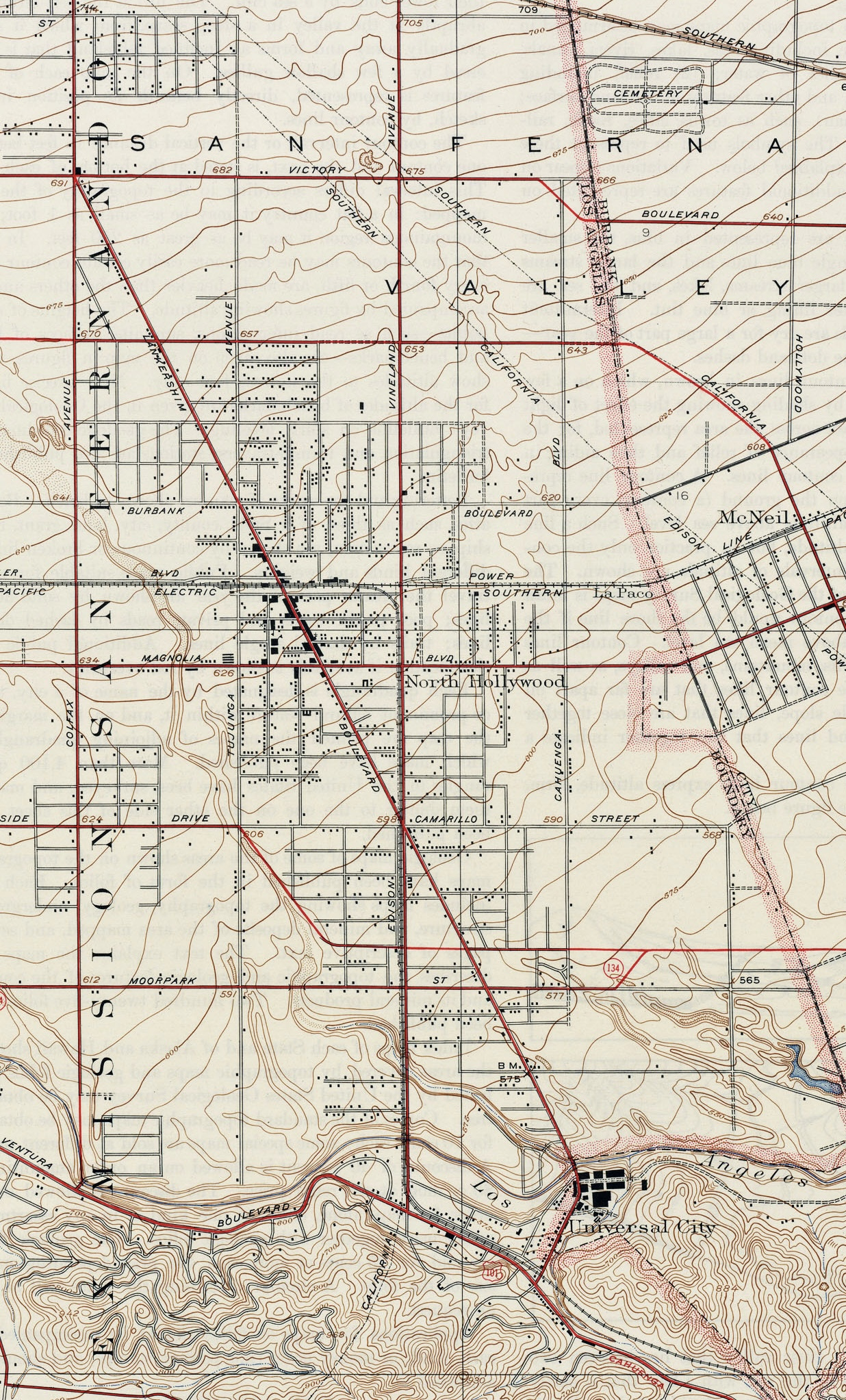
USGS topographical map, 1924

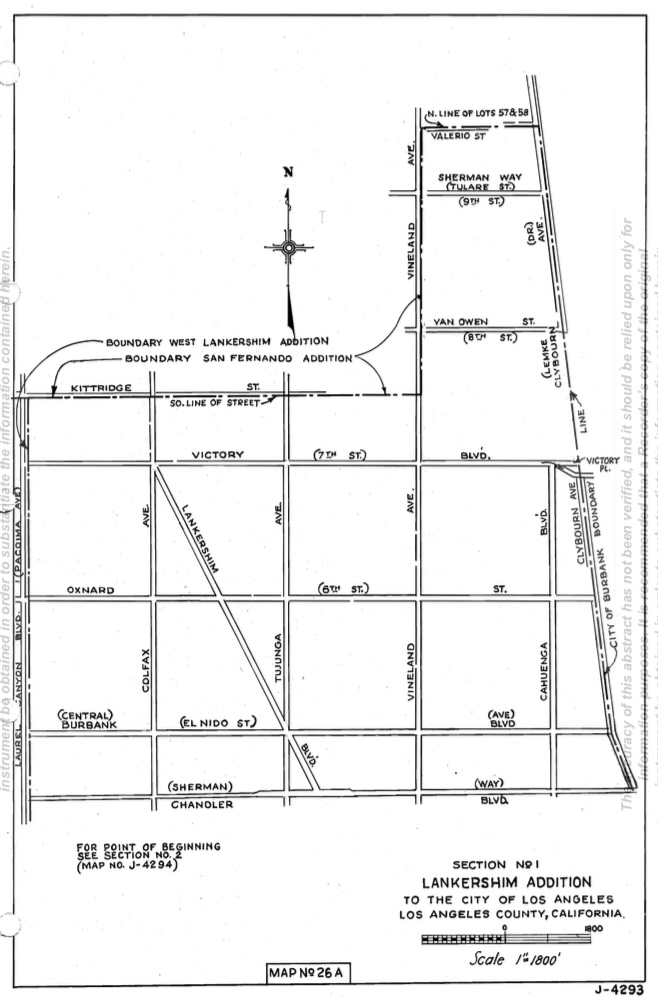
Lankershim Addition No. 1

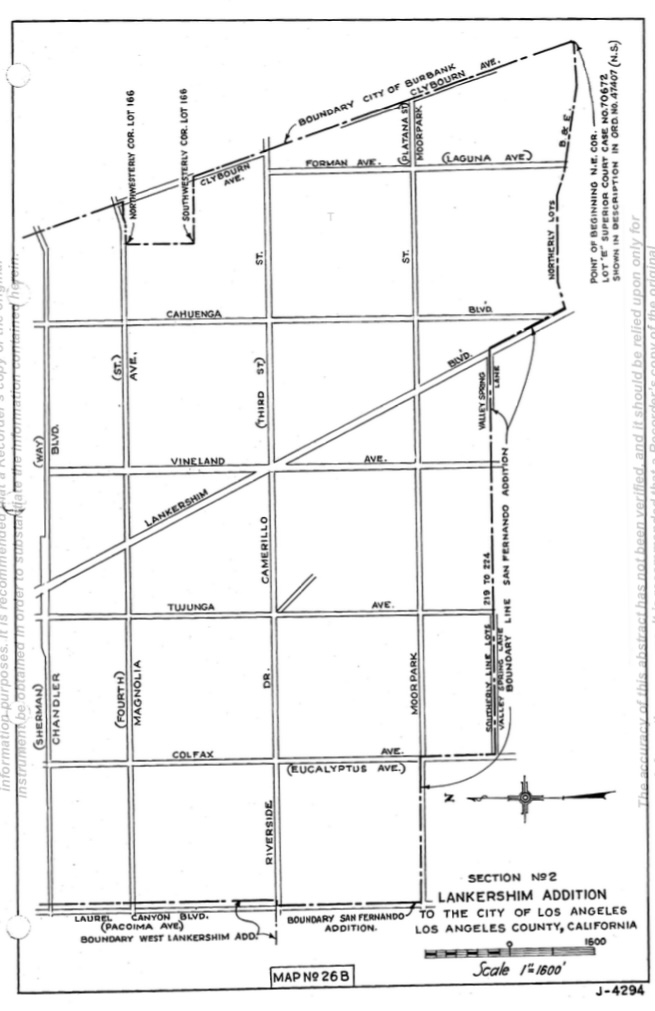
Lankershim Addition No. 2
